= List of words with the suffix -ology =

The suffix -ology is commonly used in the English language to denote a field of study. The ology ending is a combination of the letter o plus logy in which the letter o is used as an interconsonantal letter which, for phonological reasons, precedes the morpheme suffix logy. Logy is a suffix in the English language, used with words originally adapted from Ancient Greek ending in -λογία (-logia).

English names for fields of study are usually created by taking a root (the subject of the study) and appending the suffix logy to it with the interconsonantal o placed in between (with an exception explained below). For example, the word dermatology comes from the root dermato plus logy. Sometimes, an excrescence, the addition of a consonant, must be added to avoid poor construction of words.

There are additional uses for the suffix, such as to describe a subject rather than the study of it (e.g., duology). The suffix is often humorously appended to other English words to create nonce words. For example, stupidology would refer to the study of stupidity; beerology would refer to the study of beer.

Not all scientific studies are suffixed with ology. When the root word ends with the letter "L" or a vowel, exceptions occur. For example, the study of mammals would take the root word mammal and append ology to it, resulting in mammalology, but because of its final letter being an "L", it instead creates mammalogy. There are also exceptions to this exception. For example, the word angelology with the root word angel, ends in an "L" but is not spelled angelogy according to the "L" rule.

The terminal -logy is used to denote a discipline. These terms often utilize the suffix -logist or -ologist to describe one who studies the topic. In this case, the suffix ology would be replaced with ologist. For example, one who studies biology is called a biologist.

This list of words contains all words that end in ology. In addition to words that denote a field of study, it also includes words that do not denote a field of study for clarity, indicated in orange. As of April 2026 the list below contains 974 -ology words.

== A ==
-ology Word	Description	Synonyms Alternative spellings
abiology	The study of inanimate, inorganic, or lifeless things.	
abiophysiology	The study of inorganic processes in biological systems.	
acanthochronology	The study of cactus spines or euphorbia thorns grown in time ordered sequence.	
acanthology	The study of spined things, in particular sea urchins, and the resultant impact on taxonomy.	
acarology	The study of mites and ticks.	
accentology	The systematic analysis of word or phrase stress and accentuation in language.	
aceology	The science of remedies or therapeutics.	iamatology
acology	The science of medical remedies, Materia Medica.	
acridology	The study of grasshoppers and locusts (infraorder Acrididea).	
acropathology	The study of diseases affecting limbs.	
actinobiology	The study of the effects of radiation upon living organisms.	
actinology	The study of the effect of light on chemicals.	
acyrology (Note: Term is not about a field of study.)	The incorrect use of language.	cacology
adenology	The branch of medicine dealing with the development, structure, function, and diseases of glands.	
aedoeology	The study of generative organs and processes	
aerobiology	A branch of biology that studies organic particles, such as bacteria, fungal spores, very small insects, pollen grains and viruses, which are passively transported by the air.	
aerolithology	The study of meteorites.	
aerogeology	The study of geological features by aerial observation and aerophotography.	
aerology	1. The branch of meteorology involving the observation of the atmosphere by means of balloons, airplanes, etc.; 2. The study of the air and of the atmosphere; used in the US Navy until early 1957.	meteorology
aeropalynology	The study of pollen grains and spores (palynomorphs) in the atmosphere.	
aetiology	1. The establishment of a cause, origin, or reason for something.; 2. The study of causes or causation.; 3. The study or investigation of the causes of disease; a scientific explanation for the origin of a disease.	3.: etiology; ætiology
agathology	The science or theory of the good or goodness.	
agmatology	The branch of medical science that studies fractures.	
agnoiology	The study of things of which humans are by nature ignorant, or of things which cannot be known.	agniology; agnoeology
agnotology	The study of culturally induced ignorance or doubt, particularly the publication of inaccurate or misleading scientific data.	agnatology
agriology	The comparative study of primitive, illiterate, or "savage" cultures.	
agrobiology	The science of plant nutrition and growth concerning soil conditions, especially to determine ways to increase crop yields.	
agroclimatology	The study of meteorological, climatological, and hydrological conditions that are significant for agriculture owing to their interaction with the objects and processes of agricultural production.	
agroecology	The study of ecological processes that operate in agricultural production systems.	
agrogeology	The study of the origins of minerals known as agrominerals and their applications.	
agrology	1. The science and art of agriculture.; 2. A sub-discipline of soil science which addresses optimizing crop production (common usage, not acceptable to soil scientists); 3. A sub-discipline of agronomy which addresses the influence of edaphic conditions on crop production.	
agrometeorology	The study of weather and the use of weather and climate information to enhance or expand agricultural crops and/or to increase crop production.	
agrostology	The scientific study of the grasses (family Poaceae).	graminology
agrotechnology	The application of modern technology to agriculture.	
aitiology	1. The study of causation, or origination.; 2. The causes of diseases or pathologies. (medicine)	etiology; aetiology; ætiology
Albanology	An interdisciplinary branch of the humanities that addresses the language, costume, literature, art, culture, and history of Albanians.	
alethiology	The study of the nature of truth or aletheia.	alethology
algology	1. The medical treatment of pain as practiced in Greece and Turkey.; 2. The branch of botany dealing with algae.	2. phycology
alimentology	The study of nutrition.	
allergology	The study of the causes and treatment of allergies.	
alphabetology	The study of alphabetic systems of writing.	
amphibiology	The branch of zoology that deals with the class Amphibia.	
amphibology	A situation where a sentence may be interpreted in more than one way due to ambiguous sentence structure.	amphiboly
anaplastology	The branch of medicine dealing with the prosthetic rehabilitation of an absent, disfigured, or malformed anatomically critical location of the face or body.	
anatripsology	The study of friction as a remedy in medicine.	
andrology	The medical specialty that deals with male health, particularly relating to the problems of the male reproductive system and urological problems that are unique to men.	
anemology	The study of wind.	
anesthesiology	The branch of medical science that studies and applies anesthetics and anesthesia.	
angelology	The study of angels.	
angiology	The study of the anatomy of blood and lymph vascular systems.	
angiopathology	The pathology of diseased blood vessels.	
antapology	The reply to an apology.	
anthoecology	The branch of ecology that studies the relationship of flowers to their environment.	
anthology	A published collection of poems or other pieces of writing.	
anthropobiology	The study of the biological relationships of humans as a species.	bioanthropology
anthropology	The holistic scientific and social study of humanity, mainly using ethnography as its method.	
anthropomorphology	The attribution of human characteristics to God.	
anthroposociology	The anthropological and sociological study of race to establish certain people's superiority.	
anthrozoology	The study of the interactions between humans and animals.	
antitechnology	A philosophy opposing technology.	
aphasiology	The study of linguistic problems or aphasias resulting from brain damage.	
aphnology	The study of wealth.	plutology
apicology	The study of honey bee ecology.	
apiology	The scientific study of honey bees and honey-making.	apidology
apology	An acknowledgement for a failure or mistake.	
arachnology	The scientific study of spiders and related animals such as scorpions, pseudoscorpions, and harvestmen, collectively called arachnids.	
araneology	The branch of arachnology that deals with spiders.	
archaeogeology (Note: The prefix or combining form archeo means ancient. It can be alternately spelled archaeo or archæo. All words which contain archeo can be alternatively spelt with archaeo or archæo.)	The branch of geology that studies the geological formations of the past.	
archeology	The study of human activity through the recovery and analysis of material culture.	
archeozoology	The study of faunal remains or the items left behind when an animal dies.	zooarcheology
archology	The study of the science of governance or the origin of things.	
arcology	The field of creating architectural design principles for very densely populated, ecologically low-impact human habitats.	
areology	The study of the planet Mars' geology.	
aretology	1. The part of moral philosophy which treats virtue, its nature, and the means of attaining it.; 2. A narrative about a divine figure's miraculous deeds.	
aristology	The art or study of cooking and dining.	
arkeology	The study of the story of Noah's Ark, particularly the search for physical evidence which would corroborate it.	
Armenology	The study of Armenian history, language, and culture.	
arteriology	The branch of angiology dealing with arteries.	
arthrology	The branch of anatomy dealing with joints.	synosteology
arthropathology	The study of functional and structural changes made by diseases of the joints.	
arthropodology	The study of arthropods.	
Assyriology	The study of the Assyrians.	
astacology	The study of crayfish.	
asteroseismology	The study of oscillations in stars.	
astheniology	The study of diseases of weakening and aging.	
asthmology	Neologism for the study of asthma, proposed in 1981.	
astroarchaeology	The study of astronomical knowledge of prehistoric cultures.	archaeoastronomy
astrobiology	The study of the origin, evolution, distribution, and future of life in the universe: extraterrestrial life and life on Earth.	exobiology
astrogeology	The science dealing with the structure and composition of planets and other bodies in the Solar System.	exogeology
astrolithology	The study of aerolites.	
astrology	The study of the movements and relative positions of celestial objects as a means for divining information about human affairs and terrestrial events.	
astrometeorology	The study of the theoretical effects of astronomical bodies and forces on the Earth's atmosphere.	
astroseismology	The study of oscillations in stars.	asteroseismology
atheology	The resistance or opposition to theology or the study of religion	
atmology	The branch of science dealing with the laws and phenomena of aqueous vapour.	
atmospherology	The study of a planetary atmosphere.	
atomology	The study or doctrine of atoms.	
audiology	The study of the auditory and vestibular systems, and associated disorders.	
autecology	One of two broad subdivisions of ecology, which studies the individual organism or species.	
autology	The study of oneself.	
autonumerology	The study of unusual license plates.	
auxanology	The study of growth.	auxology
auxology	The study of growth.	auxanology
axiology	The philosophical study of value.	
azoology	The study of inanimate nature.	

== B ==
-ology Word	Description	Synonyms Alternative spellings
bacteriology	The scientific study of bacteria, especially in relation to disease and agriculture.	
balneology	The study of the treatment of disease by bathing, usually practiced at spas.	
barology	The study of gravity and weight and their relation.	
Bascology	The study of Basque language and culture.	
batology	The study of plants in the genus Rubus, commonly known as brambles.	
batrachology	The study of amphibians.	
battology	Continual unnecessary reiteration of the same words, phrases, or ideas.	
berestology	The study of birchbark manuscripts.	
bibliology	The study of books as physical, cultural objects.	
bioarchaeology	The study of ancient bones.	
biocenology	The branch of biology deals with studying biological communities and their members' interactions.	biocoenology
bioclimatology	The interdisciplinary field of science that studies the interactions between the biosphere and the Earth's atmosphere on time scales of the order of seasons or longer (in opposition to biometeorology).	
bioecology	The study of the relationship of organisms to each other and their environment.	
biogerontology	The sub-field of gerontology concerned with the biological aging process, its evolutionary origins, and potential means to intervene in the process.	
biology	The study of life and living organisms and their morphology, anatomy, and physiology.	
biometeorology	The study of the relationship between atmospheric conditions (the weather) and living organisms.	
biopsychology	The application of the principles of biology to study physiological, genetic, and developmental mechanisms of behavior in humans and other animals.	psychobiology; biological psychology; behavioral neuroscience
biospeleology	The branch of biology dedicated to the study of organisms that live in caves and are collectively referred to as troglofauna.	cave biology
biotechnology	The use of living systems and organisms to develop or make products.	
boxology	A representation of an organized structure as a graph of labeled nodes ("boxes") and connections between them (as lines or arrows).	
brachyology	1. The colloquial omission of words from a phrase; e.g. "morning" instead of "good morning".; 2. Concise speech or laconism.	1. brachylogy
bracketology	The practice of predicting and analyzing sports tournament brackets.	
bromatology	The study of food.	
brontology	The study of thunder.	
bryology	The branch of botany concerned with the scientific study of bryophytes.	
bumpology	Archaic and derogatory term for phrenology.	
Byzantinology	The interdisciplinary branch of the humanities that addresses the history, culture, costumes, religion, art, such as literature and music, science, economy, and politics of the Byzantine Empire.	

== C ==
-ology Word	Description	Synonyms Alternative spellings
cacology	Poor diction or word choice.	acyrology
caliology	The study of birds nests.	nidology
campanology	The study of bells: their casting, tuning, and ringing.	
cancerology	The study of cancer.	oncology
carcinology	The study of crustaceans.	malacostracology; crustalogy; crustaceology
cardiology	The study of the heart.	
caricology	The study of carex or sedges.	
cariology	The study of dental caries and cariogenesis.	
carphology	A lint-picking behavior that is often a symptom of a delirious state.	
carpology	The study of the structure of seeds and fruit.	
cartology	The creation of charts and maps based on the layout of a territory's geography.	
catachronobiology	The study of the deleterious effects of time on a living system.	
cecidology	The study of plant galls, also known as cecidia, which are growths on plants produced by insects, mites, or fungi.	cecidiology
cephalology	The science of the head.	
cereology	The study of, or practice of creating crop circles.	
cerebrology	The science that deals with the cerebrum or brain.	
cetology	The branch of zoology concerned with the order Cetacea, which includes whales, dolphins, and porpoises.	
chaology	The study of chaos and chaotic systems.	chaos theory
characterology	The study of character reading that attempts to combine revised physiognomy, reconstructed phrenology and amplified pathognomy, with ethnology, sociology and anthropology.	
chasmology	The study of yawning.	
cheloniology	The study of turtles or tortoises (order Chelonia).	chelonology; testudinology
chemo-immunology	The branch of chemistry that studies the chemical processes in immunology.	
chirology	1. The study of the hand.; 2. Palm reading.	
chondrology	The study of cartilage.	
choreology	The study of the aesthetic and science of forms of human movement by special notation; Benesh Movement Notation	
chorology	1. The study of the causal relations between geographical phenomena occurring within a particular region 2. The study of the spatial distribution of organisms.	
chresmology	The study of prophecies.	chrismology
Christology	The field of study within Christian theology which is primarily concerned with the nature and person of Jesus as recorded in the canonical Gospels and the epistles of the New Testament.	
chromatology	The study of colour.	
chronobiology	A field of biology that examines periodic (cyclic) phenomena in living organisms and their adaptation to solar- and lunar-related rhythms.	
chronology	1. The study of things in order of time or the study of time.; 2. The arrangement of events or dates in the order of their occurrence.	
chronooncology	1. The study of the influence of biological rhythms on neoplastic growths.; 2. The study of the timing of drug administration for anti-cancer treatments.	
chronopharmacology	The study of the effects of biological rhythms on pharmacotherapy and drug administration.	
chrysology	The study of the production of wealth.	
cirripedology	The study of barnacles.	
climatology	The science that deals with climates, and investigates their phenomena and causes.	
clinology	The study of retrogression and decline in form and function in an animal or organism.	
coalitionology	Speculation in the run-up to a general election about possible coalition governments that might ensue. Used in Britain and Ireland.	
coccidology	The study of scale insects, mealybugs, and organisms within the superfamily Coccoidea.	
codicology	The study of books as physical objects, especially manuscripts written on parchment (or paper) in codex form.	
codology	(Irish) Hoaxing, humbugging, bluffing, leg-pulling.	kidology
cognitology	The multidisciplinary study of mind and behavior; cognitive science	
cohomology	The theory of a sequence of abelian groups associated to a topological space, often defined from a cochain complex.	
coleopterology	The scientific study of beetles (order Coleoptera).	
collapsology	A neologism used to designate the transdisciplinary study of the risks of the collapse of industrial civilization.	
coloproctology	Branch of medicine dealing with pathology of the colon, rectum, and anus and colorectal surgery.	
cometology	The branch of astronomy that deals with comets.	
comitology	In the European Union, the system of committees, composed of representatives of the member states, is used to oversee the European Commission implementing acts made under European Union legislation.	
computerology	The study of computers, or any kind of work with computers.	
conchology	1. The study of molluscs and their shells.; 2. The hobby of shell collecting.	
coniology	The study of atmospheric dust and its effects on organisms.	
conscientiology	The study of consciousness.	
contrology	The methods of the physical fitness system called Pilates.	
coprology	The study of feces.	scatology
cosmecology	The science that considers the Earth in its relation to cosmic phenomena.	
cosmetology	The science or study of cosmetics or being a beautician.	
cosmochronology	The science of determining timescales for astrophysical objects and events.	
cosmology	The study of the origin, evolution, and eventual fate of the universe.	
craniology	A pseudomedicine primarily focused on measurements of the human skull, based on the concept that the brain is the organ of the mind and the mental state can be determined by physical external characteristics.	phrenology
crenology	The utilization of mineral springs for therapeutic purposes.	craunology
criminology	The scientific study of the nature, extent, management, causes, control, consequences, and prevention of criminal behavior, both on the individual and social levels.	
criteriology	1. The part of logic dealing with the establishment of criteria.; 2. The study of how judgments can be made solely based on specific criteria.	
crustaceology	The branch of zoology dealing with crustaceans.	carcinology; malacostracology; crustalogy
cryobiology	The study of biological material or systems at temperatures below normal.	
cryology	The study of very low temperatures and related phenomena.	
cryopedology	The study of frozen grounds and intensive frost action.	
cryoseismology	The study of cryoseism, also known as an ice quake or a frost quake.	
cryptology	The study and practice of analyzing encoded messages, to decode them.	cryptography
cryptozoology	A pseudoscience involving the search for creatures whose existence has not been proven due to lack of evidence.	
crystallology	The study of the crystalline structure of inorganic bodies.	
ctetology	The branch of biology that studies the origin and development of acquired characteristics.	
curiology	The study of picture writing, especially crude hieroglyphics.	kuriology
cyclonology	The study of cyclones.	
cyesiology	The study of gestation and pregnancy.	
cynology	The study of dogs.	
cytology	The study of cells.	
cytomorphology	The study of the structure of cells.	
cytopathology	A branch of pathology that studies and diagnoses diseases on the cellular level.	
cytophysiology	The physiology of cells.	
cytotechnology	The study of cells to detect cancer and other abnormalities.	

== D ==
-ology Word	Description	Synonyms Alternative spellings
Dacology	The study of ancient Dacia and its culture and antiquities.	
dactyliology	1. The study of finger rings.; 2. The study of gem engraving.	
dactylology	The representation of the letters of a writing system and sometimes numeral systems using only the hands, especially by the deaf; fingerspelling.	
Dantology	The study of Dante Alighieri and his works.	
defectology	A branch of science that is concerned with the study of the principles and characteristics of the development of children with physical and mental defects and the problems of their training and upbringing. Also describes the training of teachers of handicapped children. (Used in the former Soviet Union.)	
dekalogy	A series of ten related works.	
deltiology	The study and collection of postcards.	
demology	The study of human populations, activities, social conditions, and behavior.	
demonology	The study of demons, especially the incantations required to summon and control them.	daemonology
dendroarchaeology	In archaeology, the science that uses dendrochronology to date wooden material from archaeological sites.	
dendrochronology	The science that uses the spacing between the annual growth rings of trees to date their exact year of formation.	
dendroclimatology	The science that uses dendrochronology to reconstruct historical climate conditions.	
dendroecology	The science that uses dendrochronology to analyze historic ecological processes.	
dendrogeomorphology	The science that uses dendrochronology to study changes to the Earth's surface over time.	
dendrohydrology	The science that uses dendrochronology to investigate and reconstruct hydrologic processes, such as river flow and past lake levels.	
dendrology	The study of trees.	
dendropyrochronology	The use of tree rings to study and reconstruct the history of wild fires.	
deontology	The study of the nature of duty and obligation.	
dermatology	The study of skin.	
dermatopathology	A subspecialty of dermatology and pathology and to a lesser extent surgical pathology that focuses on the study of cutaneous (skin) diseases at a microscopic and molecular level.	
dermatovenerology	The study of skin disease and sexually transmitted disease and how symptoms of STD's appear on the skin.	
dermonosology	The science of nomenclature and classification of skin diseases.	
desmidiology	The study of single-celled algae.	
desmology	The study of ligaments.	
diabetology	The study of Diabetes mellitus.	
diabology	The study of the devil and beliefs of the devil in religion.	
dicaeology	An excuse or justification.	
dialectology	The scientific study of linguistic dialect, a sub-field of sociolinguistics.	
dinosaurology	The branch of paleontology that focuses on studying dinosaurs.	
diplomatology	1. The analysis of original texts or documents.; 2. The study of diplomats.; 3. The study of diplomatics.	
dipterology	The study of flies (order Diptera).	
dittology	A double reading or twofold interpretation of a text.	
docimology	The study or act of scientific testing or assaying metals and ores.	
documentology	1. The study of the recording and retrieval of information.; 2. The study of historical documents and data.	
dogmatology	The study of religious dogma.	
dosiology	The study of dosages of drugs.	dosology; posology
dosology	The study of dosages of drugs.	dosiology; posology
doxology	A short hymn of praises to God in various forms of Christian worship, often added to the end of canticles, psalms, and hymns.	
draconology	The study of dragons.	dragonology
dragonology	The study of dragons.	draconology
dramatology	The practice of viewing all symptoms as valid communications, including words, posture, tone of voice, and movements of the face and limbs; introduced by Henry Zvi Lothane.	
Dravidology	The study of the Dravidian languages, literature and culture.	
dronology	A genre of music which heavily utilizes drones. Also used to describe the use of drones in music.	
duology	A pair of related novels, plays, or movies.	
dysmorphology	The study of abnormalities of physiological development.	teratology
dysteleology	The philosophical view that existence has no telos or final cause from purposeful design.	

== E ==
-ology Word	Description	Synonyms Alternative spellings
ecclesiology	The theological study of the Christian Church.	
eccrinology	The study of the secretion of the eccrine glands.	
echinology	The study of echinoderms.	
ecohydrology	The study of the interactions between water and ecosystems.	
ecology	The scientific study of interactions among organisms and their environment.	
ecophysiology	The study of the adaptation of an organism's physiology to environmental conditions.	environmental physiology; physiological ecology
ecopsychology	The study of the relationship between human beings and the natural world through ecological and psychological principles.	
ecotoxicology	The study of the effects of toxic chemicals on biological organisms, especially at the population, community, ecosystem level.	
edaphology	A soil science concerned with the influence of soils on living things, particularly plants.	
editology	1. An epistemological system that seeks to "define the knowledge as a set of texts, discourses (and thus terms), and to assign the scientificity of those texts to the very conditions of their publishing, the manner they are accepted by the international scientific community" developed by Jean C. Baudet.; 2. The study of editing.	
eidology	The study of mental imagery.	
Egyptology	The study of ancient Egyptian history, language, literature, religion, architecture and art from the 5th millennium BC until the end of its native religious practices in the 4th century AD.	
electrobiology	The study of the production and use of electricity by biological organisms.	
electrology	1. The practice and study of electrical epilation to permanently remove human hair.; 2. The branch of physical science that deals with electricity and its properties.	
electrophysiology	The study of the electrical properties of biological cells and tissues.	
electrotechnology	The technological and industrial applications of electricity.	
emblematology	The study of emblems.	
embryology	The branch of biology that studies the development of gametes (sex cells), fertilization, and development of embryos and fetuses.	
emetology	The study of the causes of emesis (vomiting).	
emmenology	The study of menstruation.	
emotionology	1. The way a group of people think and speak about their emotions.; 2. The multidisciplinary study of emotions.	
encephalology	The study of the brain and its function, structure, and anatomy, and diseases.	
endemiology	The study of endemic diseases.	
endocrinology	A branch of biology and medicine dealing with the endocrine system, its diseases, and its specific secretions known as hormones.	
engysseismology	The branch of seismology that deals with earthquake shocks registered in or near the region of disturbance.	
enigmatology	The study of puzzles.	metagrobology
enology	The study of wines.	oenology
enteradenology	The study of the gastrointestinal tract and glands.	
enterology	The study of the intestinal tract.	
entomology	The scientific study of insects, a branch of zoology.	
entozoology	The study of entozoa, a type of microscopic parasitic worm.	
enzymology	The branch of science that studies enzymes.	
epidemiology	The study and analysis of the patterns, causes, and effects of health and disease conditions in defined populations.	
epileptology	The branch of neurology that studies epilepsy.	
epiphytology	The study of the character, ecology, and causes of plant diseases, especially epiphytotic outbreaks.	
epistemology	The branch of philosophy concerned with the theory of knowledge.	
epizootiology	The study of disease patterns within animal populations.	epizoology; veterinary epidemiology
equinology	The study of horses.	hippology
eremology	The study of deserts.	
ergology	1. The study of the psychological effects of work, or work patterns, especially the causes of work-related stress (job stress).; 2. In ethnology, knowledge originating from the study of the object culture of non-European traditional societies.	
erotology	The study of sexual stimuli and behavior.	
Ertology	Fan activities based on Ertar, an alternative reality project, created by a group of Czech science fiction fans.	
escapology	The practice or study of escaping from restraints or other traps; escape art.	
eschatology	A part of theology concerned with the final events of history, or the ultimate destiny of humanity.	
Eskimology	A complex of humanities sciences studying languages, history, literature, folklore, culture, and ethnology of people speaking Eskimo–Aleut languages and Eskimo (Inuit–Yupik)–Aleut peoples in chronological and comparative context.	inuitology
Esperantology	The study of Esperanto.	
ethnoarcheology	The ethnographic study of people for archeological reasons, usually through the study of the material remains of a society.	
ethnobiology	The scientific study of the way living things are treated or used by different human cultures.	
ethnoecology	The scientific study of how different groups of people living in different locations understand the ecosystems around them, and their relationships with surrounding environments.	
ethnoichthyology	The branch of anthropology that examines human knowledge of fish, the uses of fish, and the importance of fish in different human societies.	
ethnology	The branch of anthropology that compares and analyzes the characteristics of different people and the relationship between them.	
ethnomethodology	The study of methods people use for understanding and producing the social order in which they live.	
ethnomusicology	The study of the music of different cultures and their cultural contexts, especially non-Western ones.	
ethnomycology	The study of the historical uses and sociological impact of fungi.	
ethnopsychology	The study of alternative perceptions of the mind and its behavior.	
ethology	The scientific and objective study of non-human animal behavior rather than human behavior, usually with a focus on behavior under natural conditions, and viewing behavior as an evolutionarily adaptive trait.	
etiology	1. The study of causation, or origination.; 2. The causes of diseases or pathologies.	aetiology; ætiology; aitiology
etruscology	The study of the ancient Italian civilization of the Etruscans.	
etymology	The study of the history of words, their origins, and how their form and meaning have changed over time.	
euchology	One of the chief liturgical books of the Eastern Orthodox Church and Eastern Catholic Churches, containing the portions of the services which are said by the bishop, priest, or deacon.	
exoarcheology	Argued to be the same as xenoarcheology, a fictional science concerned with the physical remains of alien cultures. It may also mean the study of human activities in a space environment.	
exobiology	The branch of biology dealing with extraterrestrial lifeforms.	astrobiology
exogeology	A planetary science discipline concerned with the geology of the celestial bodies such as the planets and their moons, asteroids, comets, and meteorites.	astrogeology; planetary geology
exometeorology	The study of atmospheric conditions of exoplanets and other non-stellar celestial bodies outside the Solar System, such as brown dwarfs.	
exomoonology	The search for and study of exomoons.	
exoplanetology	An integrated field of astronomical science dedicated to the search and study of exoplanets (extrasolar planets).	

== F ==
-ology Word	Description	Synonyms Alternative spellings
fairyology	The study of fairies.	
faunology	The branch of zoology that deals with the geographical distribution of animals.	zoogeography
felinology	The study of cats.	
fermentology	The study of ferments and fermentation.	zymology
ferroequinology	The study of railways in general, but especially locomotives.	
festology	A type of martyrology that studies ecclesiastical festivals.	festilogy
fetology	The scientific study of fetuses.	foetology
filicology	The study of ferns.	
filmology	A 1940s movement of theoretical study relating to film.	filmologie
flatology	The study of flatulence.	
fluviology	The study of watercourses or rivers.	
fluviomorphology	The study of a river channel and the network of tributaries within the river basin.	fluvial geomorphology; river morphology
fontology	The study of fonts, or electronic typefaces.	
formicology	The study of ants.	myrmecology
fossilology	The study of fossils.	paleontology
fromology	The study of cheese.	
fulminology	The study of lighting	
fungology	The study of fungi.	mycology
futurology	The study of postulating possible, probable, and preferable futures and the worldviews and myths that underlie them.	

== G ==
-ology Word	Description	Synonyms Alternative spellings
galvanology	The study of galvanism (of biology, physics, and chemistry).	
gametology	The study of gametes.	
garbology	The study of modern refuse and trash as well as the use of trash cans, compactors, and various types of trash can liners.	
gastroenterology	The branch of medicine focused on the digestive system and its disorders.	gastrology
gastrology	The branch of medicine focused on the digestive system and its disorders.	gastroenterology
gelotology	The study of humour and laughter.	
gemology	The scientific study dealing with natural and artificial gemstone materials.	gemmology
genecology	A branch of ecology which studies the gene frequency of a species relating to their population distribution in a particular environment.	
genesiology	The study of reproduction.	
geoarcheology	A multi-disciplinary approach which uses the techniques and subject matter of geography, geology and other Earth sciences to examine topics which inform archeological knowledge and thought.	geoarchæology
geobiology	An interdisciplinary field of scientific research that explores interactions between the biosphere and the lithosphere and/or the atmosphere.	
geochronology	The science of determining the age of rocks, fossils, and sediments using signatures inherent in the rocks themselves.	
geoecology	The interdisciplinary study of geography and ecology.	
geohydrology	The area of geology that deals with the distribution and movement of groundwater in the soil and rocks of the Earth's crust (commonly in aquifers).	hydrogeology
geology	1. An earth science comprising the study of solid Earth, the rocks of which it is composed, and the processes by which they change.; 2. The study of the solid features of any celestial body (such as the geology of the Moon or Mars).; 3. The geological features of an area.	
geomorphology	The scientific study of the origin and evolution of topographic and bathymetric features created by physical, chemical, or biological processes operating at or near the Earth's surface.	
geomythology	The study of alleged references to geological events in mythology.	
geotechnology	The study of how earth, rock, and subterranean water affect the planning, execution, and operation of engineering projects.	
geotectology	The study of the structure of the Earth's crust; geotectonics.	structural geology
gephyrology	A neologism for the study of bridges and naturally occurring arches or bridge like structures.	
geratology	The study of elderly people and senility; geriatrics.	gerontology
gerodontology	The study of dentistry in elderly people.	
gerontology	The study of the social, psychological, cognitive, and biological aspects of aging; geriatrics	geratology
ghostology	The learning, teaching, knowledge, or study of ghosts, spirits, and the supernatural; ghostlore.	
gigantology	The study or description of giants.	
gizmology	The study and practice of creating and using complex devices or gadgets.	
glaciology	The scientific study of glaciers, or more generally, ice and natural phenomena that involve ice.	
glossology	1. The study of the tongue and its diseases.; 2. The definition and explanation of terms in constructing a glossary.; 3. The scientific study of language change over time; historical linguistics.	
glottochronology	The study of languages to determine when they diverged from being the same language.	
glottology	The study of languages; linguistics	
glycobiology	The study of the structure, biosynthesis, and biology of saccharides (sugar chains or glycans) that are widely distributed in nature.	
glyptology	The study or art of engraving gems or glyptics.	
gnathology	The study of the masticatory system.	
gnomology	An anthology of gnomic poetry or gnomes.	
gnomonology	The study of gnomonics.	
gnoseology	The scientific or philosophical study of knowledge.	gnosiology
gnosiology	The scientific or philosophical study of knowledge.	gnoseology
gnotobiology	The study of animals in a germ-free environment	
googology	The mathematical study of large numbers.	
graminology	The scientific study of the grasses (family Poaceae).	agrostology
grammatology	The scientific study of writing systems or scripts.	
graphology	The analysis of the physical characteristics and patterns of handwriting purporting to be able to identify the writer.	
graphopathology	The study of handwriting as a symptom of mental or emotional disorder.	
gynecology	The medical practice dealing with the health of the female reproductive systems (vagina, uterus and ovaries) and the breasts.	gynæcology; gynaecology
gynoroentgenology	The study of radiologic imaging of the gynecologic parts of the female human body in order to make a radiologic diagnosis of a gynecologic disease.	gynecological roentgenology; gynæcological roentgenology; gynaecological roentgenology

== H ==
-ology Word	Description	Synonyms Alternative spellings
hemorheology (Note: Words that contain the American prefix or combining form hema- (or sometimes hemo) can be alternatively spelt with haema- or hæma, the British English version. In both cases, it means blood.)	The study of flow properties of blood and its elements of plasma and cells.	blood rheology
hagiology	A study or biography of a saint or an ecclesiastical leader; a hagiography.	
hamartiology	The branch of Christian theology that studies sin.	
hamburgerology	A course of study introduced by McDonald's to train people to work in its fast food restaurants.	
haplology	In linguistics, the elimination of a syllable when two consecutive identical or similar syllables occur.	
hauntology	In Derridan philosophy, the paradoxical state of the specter, which is neither being nor non-being.	
hedonology	The study of the impact an injury or incident had on a person's lifestyle.	
helcology	The study of ulcers.	
heliology	The study of the sun.	
helioseismology	The study of the propagation of wave oscillations, particularly acoustic pressure waves, in the Sun.	
helminthology	The study of parasitic worms (helminths).	
hematology	The branch of medicine concerned with the study, diagnosis, treatment, and prevention of diseases related to blood.	
hemerology	The study of calendars.	
hemipterology	The study of true bugs (order Hemiptera).	
hemopathology	The branch of pathology which studies diseases of hematopoietic cells.	
henology	The philosophical account or discourse on "The One" that appears most notably in the philosophy of Plotinus.	
heortology	The study of religious festivals.	
hepaticology	The study of hepatics (division Marchantiophyta).	
hepatology	The branch of medicine that incorporates the study of liver, gallbladder, biliary tree, and pancreas as well as management of their disorders.	
herbology	The study of the use of plants for medicinal purposes; herbal medicine/herbalism.	herbalogy
heresiology	The study of heresy.	
herpetology	The branch of zoology concerned with the study of amphibians (including frogs, toads, salamanders, newts, and caecilians (gymnophiona)) and reptiles (including snakes, lizards, amphisbaenids, turtles, terrapins, tortoises, crocodilians, and the tuataras).	
heterology	1. A lack of correspondence between parts that reflects a difference in origin.; 2. An abnormality or structural difference from what is considered normal.	
hexicology	The study of the relations of living creatures to other organisms, and to their surrounding conditions.	hexiology
hexiology	The study of the relations of living creatures to other organisms, and to their surrounding conditions.	hexicology
hieroglyphology	The study of hieroglyphics.	
hierology	Sacred literature or lore or the study of it.	
hippology	The study of horses.	equinology
hippopathology	The study of the diseases and treatment or pathology of the horse.	
histology	The study of the microscopic anatomy of cells and tissues of plants and animals.	
histopathology	The microscopic examination of tissue in order to study the manifestations of disease.	
histophysiology	The physiology or study of the functions of the cells and tissues in health.	
historiology	The study of history.	
histotechnology	The study of the processes and procedures used in the preparation of slides for light microscopy.	
Hittitology	The study of the Hittites.	
hodology	The study of pathways.: 1. (neuroscience) The study of the interconnections of brain cells.; 2. (psychology) A term introduced by Kurt Lewin (1890–1947) to describe paths in a person's "life space".; 3. (philosophy) The study of interconnected ideas.; 4. (geography) The study of paths.	
Homerology	The study of the poet Homer and his works.	
Homoeology	The study of homoeologs, genes that originated by speciation but were brought back together in the same genome by allopolyploidization.	
homology	1. (anthropology and archeology). A type of analogy whereby two human beliefs, practices, or artifacts are separated by time but share similarities due to genetic or historical connections.; 2. (specifically anthropology) A structure that is shared through descent from a common ancestor.; 3. (biology) The existence of shared ancestry between a pair of structures, or genes, in different species.; 4. (chemistry) The appearance of Homologous series homologs, a compound belonging to a series of compounds differing from each other by a repeating unit.; 5. (mathematics, especially algebraic topology and abstract algebra) A general way of associating a sequence of algebraic objects such as abelian groups or modules to other mathematical objects such as topological spaces.; 6. (psychology) A relationship between characteristics that reflects the characteristics' origins in either evolution or development.; 7. (sociology) A structural resonance between the different elements making up a socio-cultural whole.	
hoplology	A science that studies human combative behavior and performance.	
hormonology	The science or study of hormones.	
horology	The art or science of measuring time and mechanical time-keeping devices.	
humorology	1. The study of humour and laughter.; 2. Humorism	
hydrobiology	The science of life and life processes in water.	
hydroecology	The study of support systems in wetlands such as the interactions between water and wildlife habitats.	
hydrogeology	The area of geology that deals with the distribution and movement of groundwater in the soil and rocks of the Earth's crust (commonly in aquifers).	geohydrology
hydrology	1. The scientific study of the movement, distribution, and quality of water on Earth and other planets, including the hydrologic cycle, water resources, and environmental watershed sustainability.; 2. (agriculture) The study of water balance components intervening in agricultural water management, especially in irrigation and drainage; agricultural hydrology.	
hydrometeorology	A branch of meteorology and hydrology that studies the transfer of water and energy between the land surface and the lower atmosphere.	
hyetology	The scientific study of precipitation.	
hygiology	The science and study of the preservation of health.	
hygrology	1. The study of bodily fluids.; 2. The study of humidity.	
hylology	The doctrine or theory that matter is unorganized.	
hymenopterology	The study of the order Hymenoptera.	
hymnology	The scholarly study of religious song, or the hymn.	
hypnology	The scientific study of sleep.	somnology

== I ==
-ology Word	Description	Synonyms Alternative spellings
iamatology	The study of medicinal remedies or therapeutics.	aceology
iatrology	The study of medicine.	
ichnolithology	The branch of geology and biology that deals with traces of organismal behavior, such as footprints and burrows.	ichnology
ichnology	The branch of geology and biology that deals with traces of organismal behavior, such as footprints and burrows.	ichnolithology
ichthyology	The branch of biology devoted to the study of fish.	
iconology	1. A method of interpretation in cultural history and the history of art used by Aby Warburg, Erwin Panofsky, and their followers that uncovers the cultural, social, and historical background of themes and subjects in the visual arts.; 2. The study of visual imagery and its symbolism and interpretation, especially in social or political terms.	
ideology	1. A collection of doctrines or beliefs shared by members of a group.; 2. The study of the origin and nature of ideas.	
idiomatology	A collection of idioms.	
idiomology	The study of idiom, jargon, or dialect.	
idiopsychology	The psychology of one's own mind.	
imagology	The study of cultural stereotypes as presented in literature.	
immunohematology	The study of the relationships between disorders of the blood and the immune system, especially antigen-antibody interaction.	
immunology	A branch of biomedical science that covers the study of immune systems in all organisms.	
immunopathology	The branch of medicine that deals with immune responses associated with disease.	
implantology	The science of or techniques involved in dental implants.	
Indology	The academic study of the history and cultures, languages, and literature of the Indian subcontinent (most specifically the modern-day states of India, Pakistan, Bangladesh, Sri Lanka, Maldives, Nepal and the eastern parts of Afghanistan)	
infectiology	The study of the diagnosis, treatment, and control of infections and infectious diseases.	infectology
insectology	The study of insects.	entomology
Inuitology	A complex of humanities sciences studying languages, history, literature, folklore, culture, and ethnology of people speaking Eskimo–Aleut languages and Eskimo (Inuit–Yupik)–Aleut peoples in chronological and comparative context.	eskimology
Iranology	An interdisciplinary field dealing with the study of history, literature, art, and culture of Iranian peoples.	
irenology	The study of peace.	
iridology	An alternative medicine technique whose proponents claim that patterns, colors, and other characteristics of the iris can be examined to determine information about a person's health; iridodiagnosis.	
Islamology	The study of Islam.	

== J ==
-ology Word	Description	Synonyms Alternative spellings
Japanology	The study of Japan, its language, culture, and history.	
Jinology	The study of Jin Yong's novels.	

== K ==
-ology Word	Description	Synonyms Alternative spellings
karstology	The study of karst formations.	
karyology	The study of the nuclei of cells, especially with regard to the chromosomes which they contain.	
Kibology	A parody religion, named after James "Kibo" Parry, the central figure.	
killology	The study of the psychological and physiological effects of killing and combat on the human psyche.	
kinesiology	The scientific study of human body movement and its physiological, mechanical, and psychological mechanisms.	
kinology	The branch of physics that deals with the laws of motion.	
koniology	The study of atmospheric dust and its effects.	coniology
kookology	The study of kooks, or eccentric people.	
Koreanology	The study of Korea.	
Kremlinology	1. The study of the internal politics of the high members of the government of the USSR.; 2. The study of the internal politics of any powerful and secretive organization.	
ktenology	The science of putting people to death, execution.	
Kubrickology	The study of Stanley Kubrick and his works.	
kymatology	The study of wave motion.	

== L ==
-ology Word	Description	Synonyms Alternative spellings
lalopathology	The study of speech disorders.	
laryngology	A branch of medicine that deals with disorders, diseases and injuries of the vocal apparatus, especially the larynx.	
lectinology	The study of lectin.	
lemology	The study of plague and epidemic diseases.	loimology; epidemiology
lepidopterology	A branch of entomology concerning the scientific study of moths and the three superfamilies of butterflies.	
leprology	The study of leprosy.	
leptology	1. A minute and tedious discourse on trifling things.; 2. The study of the forms and structures of crystals; crystallography.	
lexicology	The part of linguistics which studies words.	
lichenology	The branch of mycology that studies the lichens, symbiotic organisms made up of an intimate symbiotic association of a microscopic alga (or a cyanbacterium) with a filamentous fungus.	
limacology	The branch of zoology which deals with slugs.	
limnobiology	The branch of biology that deals with animals and plants of fresh water.	
limnology	The study of inland waters.	
lipidology	The scientific study of lipids.	
lithoidology	The study of rocks.	
lithology	1. The study of rocks, with particular emphasis on their description and classification.; 2. The description of the physical characteristics of a rock.	
liturgiology	The study of liturgy, a set of rituals that are performed, usually by a religion; liturgics.	
logology	1. The field of recreational linguistics, an activity that encompasses a wide variety of word games and wordplay.; 2. The study of all aspects of science (the science of science); 3. The study of words in search for divine truth.; 4. The study of logos.; 5. The part of linguistics that studies words.	5. lexicology
loimology	The study of pestilential diseases and plagues.	lemology; epidemiology
ludology	The study of games.	
lymphology	The study of the lymphatic system.	

== M ==
-ology Word	Description	Synonyms Alternative spellings
macrocosmology	The study or description of the macrocosm.	
macroecology	The subfield of ecology that deals with the study of relationships between organisms and their environment at large spatial scales.	
macrology	Verbose, meaningless talk; pleonasm.	
macrometeorology	The study of large-scale behavior of the atmosphere.	
macromorphology	The gross structures or morphology of an organism, mineral, or soil component visible with the unaided eye or at very low levels of magnification.	
magirology	The study of cooking.	
malacology	The branch of invertebrate zoology that deals with the study of Mollusca.	
malacostracology	The study of crustaceans.	carcinology; crustaceology; crustalogy
malariology	The study of malaria.	
mantology	Divination	
mapology	The study of maps; cartography.	
Mariology	The theological study of Mary, the mother of Jesus.	
martyrology	1. A study of martyrs and martyrdom 2. (Catholicism) Acataloge or list of martyrs and other saints and beati arranged in the calendar order of their anniversaries or feasts.; 3. (Judaism) The ten rabbis living during the era of the Mishnah who were martyred by the Romans in the period after the destruction of the second Temple.	
mastology	The study of breasts.	
mateology	A vain, unprofitable discourse or inquiry.	
mazology	The study of mammals.	mammalogy
meconology	The study of opium and its effects.	
melissopalynology	The study of pollen contained in honey and, in particular, the pollen's source.	
melittology	A branch of entomology concerning the scientific study of bees (clade Anthophila).	
membranology	The study of membranes.	
menology	A service-book used in the Eastern Orthodox Church and those Eastern Catholic Churches which follow the Rite of Constantinople; a menologium or menologe.	
mereology	In logic and philosophy, the study of parts and the wholes they form.	
mesology	1. The scientific analysis and study of interactions among organisms and their environment.; 2. The environmental or sociological influence on a person.	1. ecology
mesometeorology	The study of weather systems smaller than synoptic scale systems but larger than microscale and storm-scale cumulus systems.	mesoscale meteorology
metagrobology	The study of puzzles.	enigmatology
metallogeny	The study of the genesis and regional-to-global distribution of mineral deposits, with emphasis on their relationship in space and time to regional petrologic and tectonic features of the Earth's crust.	
metapsychology	A speculative psychology that seeks to understand the structure of the mind in terms that may not be empirically verifiable.	
meteorology	The study of the atmosphere and related phenomena such as weather.	
methodology	The systematic, theoretical analysis of the methods applied to a field of study; the study of methods.	
metrology	The science and study of measurement.	
miasmology	The study of fog and smog.; The study of the miasma theory.	
microbiology	The study of microorganisms.	
microclimatology	A branch of climatology that studies microclimates which are small, local regions having a unique pattern of weather or weather effects that differ from the local climate.	
microecology	1. The ecology of microbes.; 2. The ecology of a microhabitat.	
microhomology	The presence of the same short sequence of bases in different genes.	
micrology	1. The study of microscopes.; 2. The science of preparing microscopic objects for study.; 3. The study of trivialities or things of little importance.	
micrometeorology	The study of short-lived atmospheric phenomena smaller than mesoscale, about 1 kilometre (0.6 mi) or less.	microscale meteorology
micromorphology	Study of soil sat a microscopic level	
micropaleontology (Note: The prefix paleo is used to denote something prehistoric, old, ancient, or primitive. The alternate spellings for it include: palaeo and palæo. All words which begin with the prefix paleo- can be alternatively spelt with palaeo- or palæo-.)	The branch of paleontology that studies microfossils, or fossils that require the use of a microscope to see the organism, its morphology and its characteristics details.	
micropatriology	1. The study of micronations, political entities that claim independence and mimic acts of sovereignty but lack legal recognition.; 2. The study of microstates, sovereign states that have a very small population or land area—usually both.	micro patrology
microtechnology	The study of technology features near one micrometre in size.	
misology	The hatred or fear of reasoning or argument.	
missiology	The area of practical theology that investigates the mandate, message, and mission of the Christian church, especially the nature of missionary work.	
mixology	The art of combining various ingredients to make cocktails.	
mociology	The study of human behavior in a mobile world and the study of mobile device/phone lifestyles.	
molinology	The study of mills and other mechanical devices that use the energy of moving water or wind, or the strength of animal or human muscle to power machines.	
momiology	The study of mummies.	
monadology	The study of theory of monads.	
monology	The habit of soliloquizing, or of monopolizing conversation.	
montology	The study of mountains.	orology
morology	Foolish talk, nonsense.	
morphology	The study of the forms of things.: 1. (archeology) The study of shapes and forms (of artifacts), and their grouping into time periods.; 2. (astronomy) The study of the shape of astronomical objects such as nebulae, galaxies, or other extended objects.; 3. (biology) A branch of biology dealing with the study of the form and structure of organisms and their specific structural features.; 4. (folkloristics) The structure of narratives such as folk tales.; 5. (linguistics) The study of the structure and content of word forms.; 6. (mathematics) A theory and technique for the analysis and processing of geometrical structures, based on set theory, lattice theory, topology, and random functions.; 7. (Urban morphology) The study of the form, structure, formation, and transformation of human settlements.; 8. (materials science) The study of shape, size, texture, and phase distribution of physical objects.; 9. (architecture and engineering) The study of two-dimensional and three-dimensional symmetries, and then uses these geometries for planning buildings and structures.; 10. (social) The study of the form and structure of society.; 11. (ideological) The study of the conceptual structure of ideologies, and the rules defining the admissibility of meanings into concepts.	
morphonology	The branch of linguistics that studies the interaction between morphological and phonological or phonetic processes.	morphophonology
muscology	The branch of botany concerned with the scientific study of bryophytes (mosses, liverworts, and hornworts).	bryology
museology	The study of the designs, organization, and management of museums.	
musicology	The study of music, music history, music theory, or the physical nature of sound.	
mycetology	The study of fungi.	mycology
mycology	The branch of biology concerned with the study of fungi.	mycetology
mycotoxicology	The branch of mycology that focuses on analyzing and studying the toxins produced by fungi, known as mycotoxins.	
myology	The study of the muscular system.	
myriapodology	The study of myriapods.	
myrmecology	The branch of entomology focusing on the scientific study of ants.	
mythology	1. The study of myths.; 2. A collection of myths, especially of a specific culture or religion.	

== N ==
-ology Word	Description	Synonyms Alternative spellings
nanotechnology	The manipulation of matter on an atomic, molecular, and supramolecular scale. Otherwise accepted as the manipulation of matter with at least one dimension sized from 1 to 100 nanometers.	
nanotribology	A branch of tribology which studies friction phenomenon at the nanometer scale.	
naology	The study of ecclesiastical or sacred buildings.	
narratology	The theory and the study of narrative and narrative structure and the ways that these affect our perception.	
nasology	Parody classification of noses. The word entered dictionaries as "study of the nose".	
necrology	1. A church register containing the names of those connected with the church who have died.; 2. A list of people who have died during a specific period.; 3. The study of death or the dead.; 4. A notice of death; an obituary.	
nematology	The scientific study of nematodes.	
neoichnology	The study of footprints and traces of extant animals.	
neology	1. The study or art of creating new words or neologizing.; 2. The act of introducing a new word into a language.; 3. The holding of novel or rational religious views.	
neonatology	A subspecialty of pediatrics that consists of the medical care of newborn infants.	
neossology	The study of young birds.	
nephology	The study of clouds.	
nephrology	The study of kidneys.	
nerterology	Any study that pertains to the dead or death.	
nessology	The belief or study of the Loch Ness Monster.	
neurobiology	The study of the nervous system including the brain.	
neuroendocrinology	The study of the interaction between the nervous system and the endocrine system.	
neuroethology	The study of animal behavior and its underlying mechanistic control by the nervous system.	
neurohypnology	The study or practice of mesmerism or hypnotism.	neurypnology
neurology	A branch of medicine dealing with neurological disorders.	
neuropathology	The study of disease of nervous system tissue.	
neuropharmacology	The study of how drugs affect cellular function in the nervous system.	
neurophysiology	A branch of physiology and neuroscience that is concerned with the study of the functioning of the nervous system.	
neuropsychology	The study of the structure and function of the brain as it relates to specific psychological processes and behaviors.	
neuropterology	The study of net-winged insects (order Neuroptera).	
neuroradiology	A subspecialty of radiology focusing on the diagnosis and characterization of abnormalities of the central and peripheral nervous system, spine, and head and neck using neuroimaging techniques.	
neurypnology	The study or practice of mesmerism or hypnotism.	neurohypnology
nidology	The study of birds' nests.	caliology
nomology	The study of laws.	
noology	The systematic study and organization of everything dealing with knowing and knowledge.	noölogy
noospherology	The systematic study and organization of everything dealing with knowing and knowledge about Noosphere.	
nosetiology	The study of the causes of disease.	
nosology	A branch of medicine dealing with the classification of disease.	
nostology	The study of senility or the mental problems of aging.	gerontology
numerology	The study of the purported mystical relationship between numbers and the character or action of physical objects and living things.	
numismatology	The study or collection of money (coins, tokens, medals, paper money); numismatics.	

== O ==
-ology Word	Description	Synonyms Alternative spellings
oceanology	The branch of Earth science that studies the ocean; oceanography.	
odology	The branch of science that studies odic force.	
odonatology	The study of dragonflies and damselflies (order Odonata).	
odontology	1. The study of the structure and development of teeth.; 2. The branch of dentistry dealing with abnormalities of teeth.	
oecology	The scientific study of interactions among organisms and their environment.	œcology; ecology
oenology	The science and study of all aspects of wine and winemaking except for vine-growing and grape-harvesting which pertains to viticulture.	enology; oinology
ohnology	The state of paralogous genes that have originated by a process of whole-genome duplication.	
oinology	The science and study of all aspects of wine and winemaking except for vine-growing and grape-harvesting which pertains to viticulture.	oenology
olfactology	The study of smell.	
oligochaetology	The study of earthworms (class Oligochaeta).	
ology	A subject of study, a branch of knowledge.	
ombrology	The study of rain.	
omenology	The study of omens, divination.	
omnibology	The study of motor buses or omnibuses.	
oncology	The branch of medicine that deals with the prevention, diagnosis, and treatment of cancer.	
oneirology	The scientific study of dreams.	
onology	Foolish discourse.	
onomasiology	The branch of lexicology that deals with concepts and the terms that represent them, in particular contrasting terms for similar concepts, as in a thesaurus.	
onomatology	The study of the origin, history, and use of proper names; onomastics.	
ontology	1. (philosophy) The branch of metaphysics that addresses the nature or essential characteristics of being and of things that exist.; 2. (philosophy) The theory of a particular philosopher or school of thought concerning the fundamental types of entities in the universe.; 3. (logic) A logical system involving the theory of classes.; 4. (computer science) A structure of concepts or entities within a domain, organized by relationships; a system model.	
ontotheology	The ontology of God and the theology of being.	
onychopathology	The study of nail disease.	
oology	The study of eggs, especially those of birds.	oölogy
ophidiology	The study of snakes (clade Ophidia).	ophiology
ophiology	The branch of herpetology dealing with the study of snakes (clade ophidia).	ophidiology
ophthalmology	The branch of medicine that deals with the anatomy, physiology, and diseases of the eye.	
optology	The science of testing eyes for lenses.	
orchidology	The study of orchids (family orchidaceae).	
organology	The study of musical instruments and their classification.	
orismology	The identification, specification, and description of technical terms.	
ornithology	A branch of zoology dealing with the study of birds.	
orology	The study of mountains.	montology
orthology	1. (biology) Homologous sequences descended from the same ancestral sequence.; 2. (language) The study of the correct use of words.	
orthopterology	The scientific study of the order Orthoptera.	
oryctology	1. The study of things dug out of the Earth, such as minerals and fossils.; 2. The study of fossils, minerals, and rocks.; 3. The study of minerals; oryctognosy.	
osphresiology	1. The scientific study of smells.; 2. The study of osmosis.	
osteology	The scientific study of bones.	bioarchaeology
osteopathology	The study of diseases of the bone.	
otolaryngology	The branch of medicine that deals with conditions of the ear, nose, and throat (ENT) region.	otorhinolaryngology
otology	A branch of medicine which studies normal and pathological anatomy and physiology of the ear (hearing and vestibular sensory systems and related structures and functions).	
otorhinolaryngology	The branch of medicine that deals with conditions of the ear, nose, and throat (ENT) region.	otolaryngology
ourology	The branch of medicine that focuses on surgical and medical diseases of the male and female urinary tract system and the male reproductive organs.	Urology
ovology	1. The study of eggs.; 2. The study of ova.	

== P ==
-ology Word	Description	Synonyms Alternative spellings
pedology	The study of soils in their natural environment.	
paedology	The study of children's behavior and development.	
paleoalgology	The subdiscipline of paleobotany that deals with the study and identification of fossil algae and their evolutionary relationships and ecology.	paleophycology
paleoanthropology	The scientific study of human fossils, and the evolution of modern man.	paleanthropology
paleobiology	The study of fossils of plants and animals.	
paleobotany	The branch of paleontology that deals with the study of plant fossils.	paleophytology
paleoclimatology	The study of climate changes taken on the scale of the entire history of Earth.	
paleodendrology	The branch of paleobotany that deals with fossil trees.	
paleoecology	The scientific study of reconstructing ecosystems in the past using fossils and subfossils.	
paleoentomology	The study of prehistoric insects.	
paleoethnology	The study of the races of early man.	
paleogeology	The study of ancient geological features.	
paleohydrology	The study of ancient rivers and other hydrological features.	
paleoichnology	The branch of ichnology concerned with the study of trace fossils preserved in ancient rocks.	
paleoichthyology	The study of fossil and ancient fish.	paleichthyology
paleolimnology	The study of paleoenvironments of inland waters by examination of sediment and fossils.	
paleology	The study of antiquities.	
paleometeorology	The meteorology of the Earth's atmosphere during ancient times.	
paleontology	The scientific study of life before, and sometimes including, the start of the Holocene Epoch.	fossilogy
paleopathology	The study of diseases in ancient humans.	
paleopedology	The study of soils of past geological eras, from quite recent (Quaternary) to the earliest periods of the Earth's history.	
paleophycology	The subdiscipline of paleobotany that deals with the study and identification of fossil algae and their evolutionary relationships and ecology.	paleoalgology
paleophytology	The study of ancient plants and plant fossils; paleobotany.	
paleornithology	The study of ancient and prehistoric birds and their evolution.	
paleotempestology	The study of past tropical cyclone activity using geological proxies as well as historical documentary records.	
paleozoology	The branch of paleontology, paleobiology, or zoology dealing with the recovery and identification of organisms and the use of these fossils in the reconstruction of prehistoric environments and ancient ecosystems.	
palynology	The study of dust, which more precisely includes contemporary and fossil palynomorphs, including pollen, spores, orbicules, dinocysts, acritarchs, chitinozoans and scolecodonts, together with particulate organic matter (POM) and kerogen found in sedimentary rocks and sediments.	
pantheology	A branch of theology embracing all religions; a complete system covering all gods and religious systems.	
pantology	1. A systematic view or survey of all types of knowledge.; 2. A compendium or encyclopedia of knowledge	
papyrology	The study of ancient literature, correspondence, legal archives, etc., as preserved in manuscripts written on papyrus.	
paradoxology	1. The use of paradoxes.; 2. A paradox.	
parapsychology	A field of study concerned with the investigation of paranormal and psychic phenomena which include telepathy, precognition, clairvoyance, psychokinesis, near-death experiences, reincarnation, apparitional experiences, and other paranormal claims.	
parasitology	The study of parasites and how they interact with their hosts.	
paremiology	The study of proverbs.	
parisology	The use of equivocal or ambiguous words.	
paromology	A concession to an adversary to strengthen one's argument.	
parthenology	The study of virginity.	
pathobiology	The branch of biology that deals with pathology with greater emphasis on the biological than on the medical aspects.	
pathology	1. (anatomy) The study of macro and microscopic abnormalities in tissues.; 2. (Clinical pathology) Medical specialty that is concerned with the diagnosis of disease based on the laboratory analysis of bodily fluids, such as blood, urine.; 3. (mathematics) Any mathematical phenomenon considered atypically bad or counterintuitive.; 4. (Pathological science) A process by which the scientific process is distorted through wishful thinking or subjective bias.; 5. (speech) The area of rehabilitative medicine that treats speech or swallowing impediments.	
pathophysiology	The physiological processes associated with disease or injury, or the study of it.	physiopathology
patrology	The study of the early Christian writers who are designated Church Fathers.	
Pekingology	The study of the behavior of the government of the People's Republic of China.	Pekinology
pelology	The study of the therapeutic uses of mud.	
penology	The study of the processes devised and adopted for the punishment and prevention of crime.	
pentology	A series of five related works.	
perinatology	A branch of medicine that focuses on managing health concerns of the mother and fetus before, during, and shortly after pregnancy; Maternal-fetal medicine.	
periodontology	The specialty of dentistry that studies supporting structures of teeth, as well as diseases and conditions that affect them; periodontics.	
perissology	Superfluity of words, verbosity.	
personology	1. The assessment of a person's character or personality from outer appearance, especially the face.; 2. A theory of personality psychology advanced by Henry Murray and others.	1. physiognomy
pestology	The study of pests.	
petrology	The branch of geology that studies the origin, composition, distribution, and structure of rocks.	
phaenology	The study of periodic plant and animal life cycle events and how these are influenced by seasonal and interannual variations in climate, as well as habitat factors (such as elevation).	phenology
phagology	The study of habits related to eating or feeding.	
phantasmology	The scientific study of spiritualistic manifestations and of apparitions.	spectrology
pharmacoenvironmentology	1. A branch of pharmacology and pharmacovigilance that deals entry of chemicals or drugs into the environment after elimination from humans and animals as post-therapy.; 2. The environmental impact of a drug.	
pharmacology	The branch of medicine and biology concerned with the study of drug action.	
pharology	The scientific study of lighthouses and signal lights, their construction and illumination.	pharonology
pharyngology	The scientific study of the pharynx and its diseases.	
phenology	The study of periodic plant and animal life cycle events and how these are influenced by seasonal and interannual variations in climate, as well as habitat factors.	
phenomenology	1. May be used to describe empirical research when used to describe measurement methods in some sciences, or empirical relationships.; 2. (architecture) An aspect of philosophy based on the experience of building materials and their sensory properties.; 3. (archeology) The use of sensory experiences to view and interpret an archeological site or cultural landscape.; 4. (particle physics) A branch of particle physics that deals with the application of theory to high-energy experiments.; 5. (philosophy) The philosophical study of the structures of experience and consciousness, or the school of philosophy founded by Edmund Husserl.; 6. (psychology) The study of subjective experience.; 7. (religion) The experiential aspect of religion that describes religious phenomena in terms consistent with the orientation of worshippers.; 8. (mathematical model) A mathematical expression that relates several different empirical observations of phenomena to each other, in a way that is consistent with fundamental theory, but is not directly derived from theory.	
pherology	The study of human carrying capacity of the Earth.	
philematology	The science and study of kissing.	
philology	The study of language in written historical sources.	
phlebology	The medical specialty devoted to the diagnosis and treatment of venous disorders.	venology
phonology	A branch of linguistics concerned with the systematic organization of sounds in languages.	
phorology	The study of disease carriers and epidemic or endemic diseases.	
photobiology	The scientific study of the interactions of light and living organisms.	
photoecology	The study of or application of aerial photography to ecology and land management.	
photogeology	The study or use of aerial photography to interpret geologic features.	photogeomorphology
photogeomorphology	The study or use of aerial photography to interpret geologic features.	photogeology
photology	The study of light.	
phraseology	The study of set or fixed expressions, such as idioms, phrasal verbs, and other types of multi-word lexical units (often collectively referred to as phrasemes).	
phrenology	A pseudomedicine primarily focused on measurements of the human skull, based on the concept that the brain is the organ of the mind and that certain brain areas have localized, specific functions or modules.	craniology
phthisiology	The study of or the care, treatment, and study of tuberculosis of the lung.	
phycology	The scientific study of algae.	algology
physicology	The study of matter and its motion and behavior through space and time, along with related concepts such as energy and force; physics.	
physiology	1. A branch of biology that deals with the functions and activities of life or living matter (as organs, tissues, or cells) and of the physical and chemical phenomena involved.; 2. The study and description of natural objects.	
physiopathology	The physiological processes associated with disease or injury.	pathophysiology
phytobacteriology	The study and diagnosis of bacterial diseases of plants.	
phytolithology	The study of fossil plants.	paleophytology; phytopaleontology; paleobotany
phytology	The study of plants; botany.	
phytomorphology	The study of the physical form and external structure (morphology) of plants.	plant morphology
phytonematology	The study of plant nematodes.	
phytopaleontology	The study of ancient plants and plant fossils.	paleobotany; paleophytology; phytolithology
phytopathology	The scientific study of diseases in plants.	plant pathology
phytopharmacology	1. The study of the effects of drugs on plants.; 2. The study of medicine from plant sources.	
phytophenology	The study of phenology pertaining to plants.	
phytophysiology	The study of the physiology of plants.	
phytosociology	The branch of science which deals with plant communities, their composition and development, and the relationships between the species within them.	
piphilology	The creation and use of mnemonic techniques to remember many digits of the mathematical constant π.	
piscatology	The study, art, or science of fishing.	
pisteology	The science or study of faith.	pistology
pistology	The branch of theology dealing with faith.	pisteology
placentology	The study of the placenta.	
planetology	The scientific study of planets (including Earth), moons, and planetary systems (in particular those of the Solar System) and the processes that form them.	
planktology	The study of plankton.	
plutology	The study of wealth.	aphnology
pneumatology	The study of spiritual beings and phenomena, especially the spiritual aspect of human beings and the interactions between humans and God.	
pneumology	The study of the respiratory system and its organs.	pulmonology
pneumonology	The study of the respiratory system.	
podology	The study of the feet.	podiatry; chiropody
poenology	The study of the processes devised and adopted for the punishment and prevention of crime.	penology
pogonology	The study of beards.	
polemology	The study of human conflict and war.	
politicology	A synonym for the academic study of political science. It is infrequently used in English-speaking North America, yet the term is more commonly employed in Europe and elsewhere. Political science.	
politology	The academic branch of political science that focuses on politics. However, this term is not in popular circulation within the U.S., perhaps as it may be confused with the preceding "ology."	
polychaetology	The study of worms belonging to the class Polychaete.	
pomology	A branch of botany that studies and cultivates fruit.	
ponerology	1. The study of evil.; 2. (political) An interdisciplinary study of social issues.	
posology	The study of the dosages of drugs, especially the determination of appropriate dosages.	
potamology	The study of rivers.	
praxeology	The study of human action based on the notion that humans engage in purposeful behavior, as opposed to reflexive behavior.	praxiology
primatology	The scientific study of primates.	
proctology	The branch of medicine dealing with the pathology of and surgery upon the colon, rectum, and anus.	
projectiology	The study of out-of-body experiences.	
promorphology	1. The study of the organization of the egg, especially concerning the localization of subsequently developed embryonic structures.; 2. The branch of morphology that studies the forms of organisms from a mathematical point of view.	
protistology	The scientific study of protists.	
protozoology	The study of protozoa.	
psephology	A branch of political science which deals with the study and scientific analysis of elections.	
pseudology	Falsehood of speech, the art of lying.	
psilology	Trivial or vacuous talk.	
psychobiology	1. The study of the application of principles of biology to the study of physiological, genetic, and developmental mechanisms of behavior in humans and other animals.; 2. The branch of psychology that interprets psychological phenomena in terms of adaptation to biological, environmental, and other factors.	biological psychology, biopsychology
psychoneuroimmunology	The study of the interaction between psychological processes and the nervous and immune systems of the human body.	psychoendoneuroimmunology; psychoneuroendocrinoimmunology
psychology	The study of behavior and mind, embracing all aspects of conscious and unconscious experience as well as thought.	
psychopathology	The scientific study of mental disorders.	
psychopharmacology	The scientific study of the effects drugs have on mood, sensation, thinking, and behavior.	
psychophysiology	The branch of psychology that is concerned with the physiological bases of psychological processes.	
psychosociology	The study of problems common to psychology and sociology, particularly the way individual behavior is influenced by the groups the person belongs to.	
psychotechnology	1. Applying psychological principles and methods to study behavior in industry 2. Using technology in psychological studies	
pteridology	The study of ferns and other pteridophytes.	
pterylology	1. The branch of ornithology that studies the areas upon which birds grow feathers; pterylography.; 2. The study of pterylosis.	
ptochology	The study of pauperism or poverty.	
pulmonology	The study of the respiratory system and its organs.	pneumology; respirology
punnology	The art or practice of making puns or paronomasia.	
pyramidology	The study of pseudoscientific speculations regarding pyramids.	
pyretology	The study of fevers.	
pyritology	1. The art of using a blowpipe, and often a charcoal block, to analyze minerals and metal salts.; 2. The study of pyrite or the pyrite group.	
pyrology	The scientific study of the effects of heat or flame, often regarding explosives or chemical compounds.	

== Q ==
-ology Word	Description	Synonyms Alternative spellings
quinology	The science of the cultivation of cinchona and its use in medicine as quinine.	
quintology	A novel or piece of literature divided into five works.; The science of five	pentalogy

== R ==
-ology Word	Description	Synonyms Alternative spellings
rabdology	The practice of performing arithmetic using Napier's bones named after a treatise by John Napier.	rhabdology
raciology	The study of races and ideas trying to justify the beliefs of racism, racialism, and other ideas of classifying individuals of different phenotypes into discrete races.	racial anthropology
radiobiology	The study of the effect of ionizing radiation on living things.	
radioecology	The study of the effects of radiation and radioactive substances on ecological communities and natural ecosystems.	
radiogeology	1. The study of the distribution of radioactive elements in the Earth's crust.; 2. A technique of dating materials by examining their radioactivity.	
radiohydrology	The study of hydrology as used in the processing of radioactive materials.	
radioimmunology	The study of immunology using antigens or antibodies labelled with radioisotopes.	
radiology	1. A medical specialty that uses imaging to diagnose and treat diseases seen within the body.; 2. The use of radioactive substances in the diagnosis and treatment of disease.	roentgenology
radiotechnology	1. The technical application of any form of radiation to industry.; 2. The technology of a radio.	
reactology	The scientific study of psychological reactions.	
redology	The academic study of Cao Xueqin's Dream of the Red Chamber, one of the Four Great Classical Novels of China.	
reflexology	1. An alternative medicine involving a system of massage and application of pressure used to relieve tension and illness.; 2. The study and interpretation of behavior in terms of simple and complex reflexes.	
respirology	The study of diseases involving the respiratory tract.	pulmonology
retinology	The study of the Retina and its uses and function in the Eye	
rhabdology	The practice of performing arithmetic using Napier's bones named after a treatise by John Napier.	rabdology
rheology	The study of the flow of matter.	
rheumatology	The study of rheumatic disorders.	
rhinology	The study of the nose, including the sinuses.	
rickettsiology	The study of rickettsia.	
Ripperology	The study of Jack the Ripper, an unidentified serial killer	
roentgenology	The study or use of radiation in the treatment or diagnosis of disease; radiography.	rontgenology; radiology; röntgenology
röntgenology	The study or use of radiation in the treatment or diagnosis of disease. Radiography.	rontgenology; radiology; roentgenology
rumpology	The claimed ability to foretell the future by analyzing the characteristics of a person's buttocks.	
runology	The study of the Runic alphabets, Runic inscriptions and their history.	

== S ==
-ology Word	Description	Synonyms Alternative spellings
saprobiology	The study of decaying organic matter and animals, saprophytes, that derive nutrients from it.	
sarcology	The study of the soft parts of the body which include the studies: myology, angiology, neurology, and splanchnology.	
satanology	The study of Satan.	
scatology	The study of feces.	coprology
Scientology	A body of religious beliefs and practices created in 1954 by American science fiction author L. Ron Hubbard.	
sclerochronology	The study of periodic physical and chemical features in the hard tissues of animals that grow by accretion and the temporal context in which they formed.	
sclerology	The study of the sclera of the eye.	
sedimentology	The study of natural sediments (silt, clay, and sand) and of the processes by which they are formed.	
seismology	The scientific study of earthquakes and the propagation of elastic waves through the Earth or through other planet-like bodies.	
selenology	The scientific study of the moon.	
selenomorphology	The study of the lunar surface and landscape.	
semasiology	A discipline within linguistics concerned with the meaning of a word independent of its phonetic expression.	
sematology	1. The science of language as expressed by signs.; 2. A branch of linguistics studying the meaning of words; semantics.	
semiology	1. (semiotics) The study of signs.; 2. (medicine) The science of the signs or symptoms of disease.; 3. The art of using signs in signaling.	1, semeiology: 2. symptomatology
senology	The branch of medicine that deals with disorders of the breast.	
serology	The scientific study of serum and other bodily fluids.	
serpentology	The study of snakes.	
sexology	The scientific study of human sexuality, including human sexual interests, behaviors, and functions.	
siagonology	The study of jawbones.	
sialosemeiology	The study and analysis of saliva in medical diagnoses.	
sindhology	The study of the history, society, culture, and literature of Sindh, a province of Pakistan.	
sindonology	The study of the Shroud of Turin.	
sinology	The academic study of China primarily through Chinese language, literature, and history.	
siphonapterology	The scientific study of fleas and other insects of the order Siphonaptera.	
sitiology	The study of food, diet, and nutrition; dietetics.	
sitology	The branch of medicine dealing with nutrition and dietetics.	sitiology
skatology	The study of feces.	scatology; coprology
sociobiology	A field of scientific study that is based on the hypothesis that social behavior has resulted from evolution and attempts to explain and examine social behavior within that context.	
socioecology	The scientific study of how social structure and organization are influenced by an organism's environment.	
sociology	The study of society, human social interaction, and the rules and processes that bind and separate people not only as individuals but as members of associations, groups, and institutions.	
sociophysiology	An interdisciplinary field of research encompassing sociology and physiology that studies the physiological side of human interrelations.	
somatology	The study or science of the human body's physical nature as a branch of anthropology.	
somatotypology	The study of somatotypes.	
somnology	The scientific study of sleep and related disorders.	
sonology	The study of sound in a variety of disciplines.: 1. (medicine) The field of radiology using medical ultrasonography.; 2. (electronic music) The use or study of Acoustics, electronics, informatics, composition and psychoacoustics in electronic music and computer music.; 3. The use of sound for therapeutic and religious purposes.	
sophiology	1. A philosophical concept regarding wisdom, as well as a theological concept regarding the wisdom of God.; 2. The science of ideas.	
sophology	The study of wisdom.	
soteriology	The study of religious doctrines of salvation.	
Sovietology	The study of politics and policies of the Soviet Union and former communist states.	
spectrology	The study of the interaction between matter and electromagnetic radiation and the analysis of the electromagnetic spectrum.	
speleology	The study of caves and other karst features.	spelacology; spelæology; spelaeology
spermology	1. The study of trivia.; 2. The study of seeds.	
sphagnology	The study of sphagnum moss.	
sphygmology	The study of the pulse and its use in diagnosis of disease.	
spinology	The study of maintaining the alignment of the spine through non-surgical techniques.	
splanchnology	The study of the visceral organs.	
splenology	The study of the spleen and its diseases and functions.	
spongiology	The study of sponges (phylum Porifera).	
stasiology	The study of political parties.	
stemmatology	The study of multiple surviving versions of the same text to reconstruct a lost original; stemmatics.	stemmology
stereology	The three-dimensional interpretation of two-dimensional cross sections of materials or tissues.	
stichology	The study of poetic metres.	
stigmeology	The art of punctuation.	
stomatology	The study of the mouth and nearby organs and their disorders.	
storiology	The study of folklore and legends.	
strabismology	The study of strabismus	
stringology	The study of algorithms and data structures used for processing text strings in programming and computing.	
strollology	The science of strolling.	promenadology
stromatology	The study of stratified rocks.	
suicidology	The scientific study of suicidal behaviour and suicide prevention.	
Sumerology	The study of the ancient Sumerian civilization.	
symbiology	The study of symbiosis.	
symbology	The study of symbols.: 1. The study of signs and symbols; semiotics.; 2. (iconography) The branch of art history which studies images.; 3. (Symbolic anthropology) A diverse set of approaches within cultural anthropology that view culture as a symbolic system that arises primarily from human interpretations of the world.; 4. An encoding scheme, particularly for barcodes.	1. symbolology
symbolology	The study or use of symbols.	symbology
symptomatology	A set of symptoms characteristic of a medical condition or exhibited by a patient.	symptomology
symptomology	A set of symptoms characteristic of a medical condition or exhibited by a patient.	symptomatology
synantherology	The study of plants in the family Asteraceae.	
synchronology	The systematic arrangement of synchronous or contemporaneous events.	
syndesmology	The study of ligaments.	
synechology	The theory of continuity or universal causation.	synechiology
synecology	The ecological study of whole plant or animal communities.	
synoecology	The study of relationships between species.	
synosteology	The study of joints.	arthrology
syphilology	The scientific study of the diagnosis and treatment syphilis.	
systematology	The study of nature regarding the formation of systems.	
systemology	The study of systems and the logic of systems.	

== T ==
-ology Word	Description	Synonyms Alternative spellings
Tangutology	The study of the culture, history, art, and language of the ancient Tangut people.	
tartarology	The study of the underworld or doctrine pertaining to Hell.	
tautology	1. (rhetoric) A self-reinforcing pretense of significant truth.; 2. (grammar) The use of redundant words.; 3. (logic) A universal truth in formal logic.; 4. (rule of inference) A rule of replacement for logical expressions.	
taxology	The technique or study of identifying, naming, and classifying things; taxonomy.	
technology	1. Machinery and equipment developed from the application of scientific knowledge.; 2. The collection of techniques, skills, methods, and processes used in the production of goods or services or in the accomplishment of objectives, such as scientific investigation.; 3. The branch of knowledge and study of industrial and practical uses and industrial of engineering and applied science discoveries	technicology
tectology	A Bogdanovian discipline that unified all social, biological, and physical sciences by considering them as systems of relationships.	tektology
teleology	A thing's orientation toward a goal; its end-directedness.	
teleseismology	The study of teleseisms or very distant seismic events.	
telmatology	The branch of physical geography concerned with the study of wetlands, such as marshes or swamps.	
tenontology	The study of tendons.	
tephrochronology	A geochronological technique that uses discrete layers of tephra—volcanic ash from a single eruption—to create a chronological framework in which paleoenvironmental or archeological records can be placed.	
teratology	The study of abnormalities of physiological development.	dysmorphology
terminology	1. The study of terms and their use.; 2. A set of terms used for a specific application or study.	
terotechnology	The study of the costs associated with installing, commissioning, maintaining, replacing, and removing plant machinery and equipment	
testaceology	The study of testaceous mollusks.	conchology
testudinology	The study of turtles or tortoises (order Chelonia).	chelonology; cheloniology
teuthology	A branch of malacology dealing with the study of cephalopods.	
textology	1. The study of the production of texts.; 2. A branch of linguistics that deals with texts as communication systems.	
thanatology	The scientific study of death.	
thaumatology	The study of miracles.	
theology	The study of God and religious ideas.	
thereology	The science of healing and treatment of diseases; therapeutics.	
theriogenology	A branch of veterinary medicine concerned with reproduction.	
theriology	The study of mammals.	mammalogy; mastology; therology
thermology	1. The study of heat.; 2. (medicine) A science that uses infrared images of the body to diagnose problems.	
therology	The study of mammals.	theriology; mastology; mammalogy
Thracology	The scientific study of Ancient Thrace and Thracian antiquities.	
thremmatology	The field of breeding or propagating plants and animals.	
threpsology	The study of nutrition	alimentology; sitiology; sitology
thymology	The study of those human aspects that precede or cause purposeful human behavior.	
Tibetology	The study of things related to Tibet, including its history, religion, language, politics and the collection of Tibetan articles of historical, cultural and religious significance.	
tidology	The science or study of tides.	
timbrology	The study of postage stamps; philately.	
timology	The study of values or excellence.	
tocology	The study of childbirth and obstetrics.	tokology
tokology	The study of childbirth and obstetrics.	tocology
tonology	The study of tone in human languages.	
topology	1. (mathematics) The properties of space that are preserved under continuous deformations, such as stretching and bending, but not tearing or gluing. This can be studied by considering a collection of subsets, called open sets, that satisfy certain properties, turning the given set into what is known as a topological space.; 2. (membrane topology) The specific orientation of transmembrane proteins.; 3. (electronics) The configuration of electronic components.; 4. (Network topology) Configurations of computer or biological networks.; 5. (Geospatial topology) The study or science of places with applications in earth science, geography, human geography, and geomorphology.; 6. (cartography) Used to describe a map (a topological map) that is greatly simplified but preserves the mathematical topology while sacrificing scale and shape.; 7. (phylogenetics) The branching pattern of a phylogenetic tree.	
toxicology	A branch of biology, chemistry, and medicine concerned with the study of the adverse effects of chemicals (poisons) on living organisms.	
toxology	1. The study of projectiles and trajectories.; 2. Archery, or the study of archery.	
trachelology	The study of the neck and related injuries and disease.	
transitology	The study of the process of change from one political regime to another.	
traumatology	1. (medicine) The study of wounds and injuries (traumas) caused by accidents or violence to a person, and the surgical therapy and repair of the damage.; 2. (psychology) The study, development, and application of psychological and counseling services for people who have experienced extreme or traumatic events.	
tribology	The study of science and engineering of interacting surfaces in relative motion.	
trichology	The branch of dermatology that deals with the scientific study of the health of hair and scalp.	
trolleyology	An area of philosophy dealing with the kind of moral dilemma typified by the trolley problem.	
trophology	The study of food combining.	
tropology	1. The use of figurative language in speech or writing.; 2. A study, treatise, or interpretation of figurative meanings in the Bible.	
tsiology	The study of or a treatise on tea.	
Turkology	The study of the languages, history, literature, folklore, culture, and ethnology of people speaking Turkic languages and Turkic peoples.	
typhlology	The study of blindness.	
typology	The study of types.: 1. (farm) The classification of farms by the USDA.; 2. (Milewski's typology) A language classification system.; 3. (morphological) A way of classifying the languages of the world that groups languages according to their common morphological structures.; 4. (Oakeshott typology) A classification system of medieval swords.; 5. (Pavlov's typology) The first systematic approach to the psychophysiology of individual differences.; 6. (Psychological typologies) Classifications used by psychologists to describe the distinctions between people.; 7. (Sasang typology) A classification scheme in Traditional Korean medicine.; 8. (Sociopolitical typology) The four types, or levels, of a political organization.; 9. (anthropology) The division of culture by races.; 10. (archaeology) The classification of artifacts according to their characteristics.; 11. (linguistics) The study and classification of languages according to their structural features.; 12. (psychology) A model of personality types.; 13. (statistics) A concept in statistics, research design, and social sciences.; 14. (theology) In Christian theology, the interpretation of some figures and events in the Old Testament as foreshadowing the New Testament.; 15. (urban planning and architecture) The classification of characteristics common to buildings or urban spaces.; 16. (Johnson's typology) A classification of intimate partner violence (IPV).	
typtology	The study of spirit rapping, or the theory that spirits communicate with the living by tapping various codes.	

== U ==
-ology Word	Description	Synonyms Alternative spellings
ufology	The study of reports, visual records, physical evidence, and other phenomena related to unidentified flying objects (UFO).	
universology	The study and science of the universe.	
uranology	The study of heavens.	
urbanology	The branch of sociology that studies the problems of living in cities and towns.	
uredinology	The study of rust molds.	mycology
urinology	The study of urine and the urinary system.	
urogynecology	A surgical sub-specialty of urology and gynecology.	
urolithology	The study of the formation, composition, effects, and removal of urinary calculi.	
urology	The branch of medicine that focuses on surgical and medical diseases of the male and female urinary tract system and the male reproductive organs.	
uronology	The branch of medicine dealing with urine.	

== V ==
-ology Word	Description	Synonyms Alternative spellings
vaccinology	The study, development, and production of vaccines.	
valeology	The study of healthy living	
Vaticanology	The study of the politics, decisions, and functioning of the Vatican, Holy See, and Roman Catholic Church.	
velology	The study and collection of vehicle tax discs.	
venereology	The branch of medicine dealing with the study and treatment of sexually transmitted diseases.	
venology	The study of veins.	phlebology
vermeology	The study of worms.	helminthology
vexillology	The study of the history, usage, and symbolism of flags.	
victimology	The study of the victims of crime, and especially of the reasons why some people are more prone to be victims.	
Vietnamology	The study of Vietnam.	
virology	The study of viruses.	
vitaminology	The study of vitamins.	
vocology	The science and practice of vocal habilitation, or vocal training and therapy.	
volcanology	The study of volcanoes, lava, magma, and related geological, geophysical and geochemical phenomena.	vulcanology
vulvology	The study of the vulva.	

== W ==
-ology Word	Description	Synonyms Alternative spellings
webology	The study of World Wide Web.	

== X ==
-ology Word	Description	Synonyms Alternative spellings
xenoanthropology	The branch of xenology dealing with extraterrestrial cultures	xenoarcheology
xenoarcheology	A fictional science, concerned with the physical remains of alien cultures.	exoarcheology
xenobiology	A subfield of synthetic biology dealing with the study of synthesizing and manipulating biological devices and systems.	
xenodochionology	The study of hotels or inns.	
xenology	1. (science fiction) The study of alien life.; 2. (genetics) Homology from horizontal gene transfer.	
xylology	The study of wood.	

== Z ==
-ology Word	Description	Synonyms Alternative spellings
zooarcheology	The study of animal remains at archeological sites.	archeozoology
zoogeology	The study of fossil animal remains.	
zoology	The scientific study of the behavior, structure, physiology, classification, and distribution of animals.	zoölogy
zoonosology	The study of animal diseases.	
zoopathology	The veterinary study specializing in the diagnosis of animal diseases through the examination of animal tissue and body fluids.	veterinary pathology
zoophysiology	The study of the physiology of animals.	
zoophytology	The natural history of zoophytes.	zoöphytology
zoopsychology	The study of psychology in animals.	
zygology	A branch of technology dealing with joining and fastening.	
zymology	The science of or knowledge concerning fermentation.	zumology
zymotechnology	The study of fermentation, especially yeast fermentation in beer-brewing.	
zythology	The study of beer and beer-brewing.	

== See also ==
- Index of branches of science
- -logy
- -ology
