= Typology =

System of classification

A typology is a system of classification used to organize things according to similar or dissimilar characteristics. Groups of things within a typology are known as "types".

Typologies are distinct from taxonomies in that they primarily address things not categorizable based on empirical and objective characteristics, such as abstract and conceptual ideas or subjective criteria, though the two terms are sometimes used interchangeably.

The earliest evidence for the use of typology as a noun in the English language dates to the 1850s when it was invoked by William Maxwell Hetherington.

== See also ==
- Typology (anthropology), human anatomical categorization based on morphological traits
- Typology (archaeology), classification of artefacts according to their characteristics
- Building typology, relating to buildings and architecture
- Farm typology, farm classification by the USDA
- Typology of Greek vase shapes, classification of Greek vases
- Johnson's Typology, a classification of intimate partner violence
- Typology (linguistics), study and classification of languages according to their structural features
  - Morphological typology, a method of classifying languages
- Typology (psychology), a model of personality types
  - Psychological typologies, classifications used by psychologists to describe the distinctions between people
- Sociopolitical typology, four types, or levels, of a political organization
- Typology (statistics), a concept in statistics, research design and social sciences
- Typology (theology), the Christian interpretation of some figures and events in the Old Testament as foreshadowing the New Testament
- Blanchard's transsexualism typology, a controversial classification of trans women
- Typology (urban planning and architecture), the classification of characteristics common to buildings or urban spaces
- The Bechers' photographic typologies
- Typification, a process of creating standard (typical) social construction based on standard assumptions
- Topology (disambiguation)
- Type (disambiguation)
