= Dendropyrochronology =

Dendropyrochronology is the science of using tree-ring dating to study and reconstruct the history of wild fires. It is a subfield of dendrochronology, along with dendroclimatology and dendroarchaeology.

== See also ==
- Dendroclimatology
- Dendroarchaeology
