= Outline of health sciences =

Sciences that focus on health or health care

The following outline is provided as an overview of and topical guide to health sciences:

Health sciences – those sciences that focus on health, or health care, as core parts of their subject matter. Health sciences relate to multiple academic disciplines, including STEM disciplines and emerging patient safety disciplines (such as social care research).

== Medicine and its branches ==
Medicine is an applied science or practice of the diagnosis, treatment, and prevention of disease. It encompasses a variety of health care practices evolved to maintain and restore health by the prevention and treatment of illness. Below are some of the branches of medicine.

- Anesthesiology is the brand of medicine that deals with life support and anesthesia during surgery.
- Angiology deals with the diseases of the circulatory system.
- Audiology focuses on preventing and curing hearing damage.
- Bariatrics deals with the causes, prevention, and treatment of obesity.
- Cardiology deals with disorders of the heart and the blood vessels.
- Critical care medicine focuses on life support and the intensive care of the seriously ill.
- Dentistry is the branch of medicine that consists of the study, diagnosis, prevention, and treatment of diseases, disorders, and conditions of the oral cavity, commonly in the dentition but also the oral mucosa, and of adjacent and related structures and tissues, particularly in the maxillofacial (jaw and facial) area.
- Dermatology deals with the skin, its structure, functions, and diseases.
- Emergency medicine focuses on care provided in the emergency department.
- Endocrinology deals with disorders of the endocrine system.
- Family medicine is a medical specialty devoted to comprehensive health care for people of all ages.
- Gastroenterology deals with the study and care of the digestive system.
- General Practice (often called Family Medicine) is a branch of medicine that specializes in primary care.
- Geriatrics is the branch of medicine that deals with the general health and well-being of the elderly.
- Gynecology deals with the health of the female reproductive systems and the breasts.
- Hematology deals with the blood and the circulatory system.
- Hepatology deals with the liver, gallbladder and the biliary system.
- Infectious disease is a branch of medicine that deals with the diagnosis and management of infectious disease, especially for complex cases and immunocompromised patients.
- Clinical immunology is the study of the human immune system.
- Kinesiology is the scientific study of human or non-human body movement.
- Laboratory medicine deals with diagnostic laboratory examinations and tests and their interpretation what makes in a medical laboratory.
- Medical physics is the branch of medicine and science that deals with applications of physics concepts, theories, and methods to medicine or health care.
- Neurology deals with the brain and the nervous system.
- Nephrology is the branch of medicine which deals with the kidneys.
- Oncology is the branch of medicine that studies of cancer.
- Ophthalmology deals with the eyes.
- Orthopedics is a branch of surgery concerned with conditions involving the musculoskeletal system
- Otolaryngology deals the ears, nose, and throat.
- Pathology is the study of diseases, and the causes, processes, nature, and development of the disease.
- Pediatrics is the branch of medicine that deals with the general health and well-being of children.
- Pharmacy is the art and practice of preparing, preserving, compounding, and dispensing medication.
- Pharmacology is study and practical application of preparation, use, and effects of drugs and synthetic medicines.
- Public health and preventive medicine is the branch of medicine concerned with the health of populations.
- Pulmonology is the branch of medicine that deals with the respiratory system.
- Psychiatry deals with the study, diagnosis, treatment, and prevention of mental disorders.
- Clinical psychology is a health discipline concerned with the biopsychosocial study of the mind, brain, behavior and the diagnosis, treatment and prevention of psychological disorders.
- Radiology is the branch of medicine that employs medical imaging to diagnose and treat disease.
- Rheumatology deals with the diagnosis and treatment of rheumatic diseases.
- Splanchnology deals with visceral organs.
- Surgery is the branch of medicine that uses operative techniques to investigate or treat both disease and injury, or to help improve bodily function or appearance.
- Urology is the branch of medicine that deals with the urinary system and the male reproductive system.
- Veterinary medicine is the branch of medicine that deals with the prevention, diagnosis, and treatment of disease, disorder, and injury in nonhuman/animals.

== History of health sciences ==
- History of medicine

== General health sciences concepts ==
- Disease
- Healing
- Health
- Health care
- Health informatics
- Doctor
  - Dentist
  - Physician
  - Surgeon
  - Veterinarian
- Hospital
- Nurse
- Medication
- Operation

== Diagnostic methods ==
- Physical examination
  - Auscultation
  - Percussion
- Medical history
- Medical imaging
  - X-ray
  - CT scan
  - PET scan
  - MRI
  - SPECT (single-photon emission computed tomography)
  - Ultrasound
  - Microscopy
- Phlebotomy / Venipuncture
- Rating scales

== See also ==
- Academic medical centre
- Biomedical sciences
- Health economics
- List of life sciences
