= Acanthochronology =

Study of cactus spines and the chronology of their growth

Acanthochronology is the study of cactus spines or Euphorbia thorns grown in time ordered sequence (i.e. in series). Physical, morphological or chemical characteristics and information about the relative order or absolute age of the spines or thorns is used to study past climate or plant physiology.

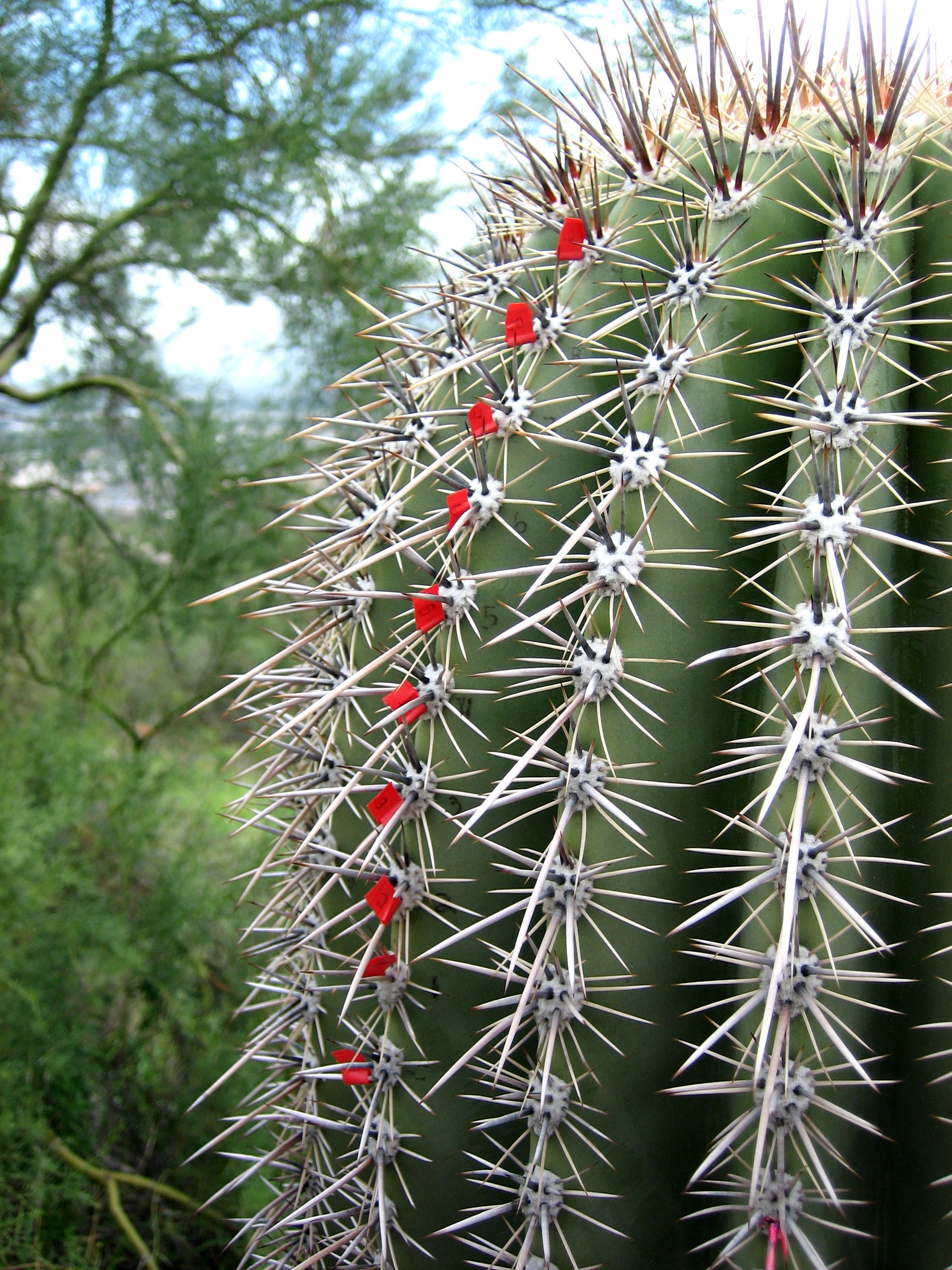
Spines grown in series on a ~1m tall saguaro cactus in Tucson, Arizona. The numbers written on the cactus in black ink denote the order that the spines grew - youngest towards the apex, oldest towards the base.

For example, columnar cactus spines grow from the apex of the plant. After several weeks the spines stop growing and have been moved to the side of the stem. The old spines remain in place for decades as new spines are created at the continually growing apex. The result is that along each external "rib" of the cactus is a series of spines arranged in the order they grew in – the oldest spines are at the bottom and the youngest spines are at the top. These spines can be dated using bomb-spike Carbon-14 and isotopes of carbon (Carbon-13) and oxygen (Oxygen-18) may be used to infer past climate (e.g. precipitation or temperature), plant stem growth or plant physiology (e.g. photosynthetic processes). Alternatively, the width of small transverse bands in the spine may be used to infer daily information about cloud cover or plant productivity, although this remains to be tested. It has also been shown that regular waxy banding on the sides of a Costa Rican cactus (Lemaireocereus aragonii) indicate annual growth and can be used as temporal chronometers.

Transverse banding on a spine from a fishhook barrel cactus growing in Tucson, Arizona. Each band (1 couplet of thick white and thin red lines) represents one day of spine growth. Each square in the bottom scale = 1 centimeter.

This sub-discipline of paleoclimatology and ecophysiology is relatively new. Acanthochronology is closely related to dendrochronology, dendroclimatology and isotope geochemistry and borrows many of the methods and techniques from these sub-disciplines of the Earth Sciences. It also draws heavily from the field of ecophysiology, a branch of Biology, to ascribe spine or thorn characteristics to particular environmental or physiological variables.

The first peer-reviewed article to present and explain an isotope spine series was from a saguaro cactus in Tucson, Arizona. This and other work shows that radiocarbon and isotope time-series derived from spines can be used for demographic or palaeoclimate studies.

A record of isotopic variation in spine tips spanning 1.77 m of a saguaro cactus in Tucson, Arizona. Click on image for a more detailed explanation.
