= Orthology =

Orthology may refer to:

- Orthology (biology): homologous sequences originate from the same ancestors (homolog e.g. all globin protein), which are separated from each other after a speciation event, e.g. human beta and chimp beta globin. An orthologous gene is a gene in different species that evolved from a common ancestor by speciation. Normally orthologous genes retain the same function in the course of evolution. (orthobiology)
- Orthology (language): the study of the correct use of words. (ortholinguistics)
- Orthotics: an exoskeleton that stabilizes broken muscle and bone.
