= Logology =

Logology may refer to:

- Logology (linguistics) in recreational linguistics is a wide variety of word games and wordplay
- Logology (theology), the study of words in search for divine truth
- Lexicology, the study of word meaning and function
