= Jaroslav Velinský =

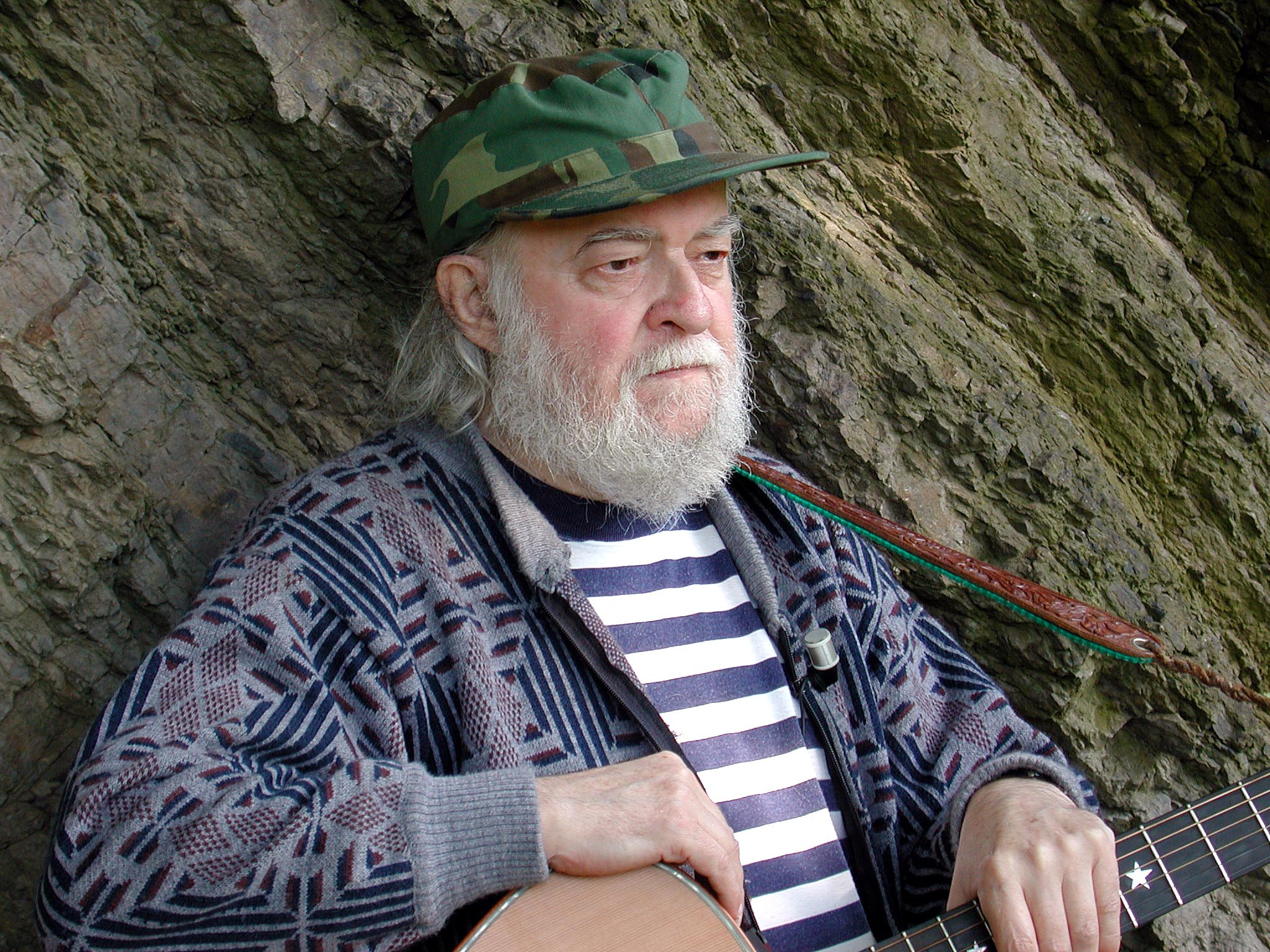
Jaroslav Velinský

Jaroslav Velinský (December 18, 1932 – February 19, 2012) was a Czech science fiction and detective writer, publisher, songwriter and musician. In the folk arena and among sci-fi friends and fans he was known as Kapitán Kid (other pseudonyms included: Václav Rabský, C.P. Stonebridge and Agáta Bílá).

== Life and career ==
Velinský was born in Prague, Czechoslovakia, in 1932. A player of both banjo and swing guitar, he wrote more than 50 country and folk songs, including "Jenofefa", "Krinolina" and "Mary Celeste", and was one of the founders of the Czech folk festival, Porta.

His science-fiction books included Engerlings, Notes from Garth, Dzwille, and Continent of Unlimited Possibilities. He was an honorary member of the Ertar-Czech Relations Society, a science-fiction club. He wrote eight staged theater plays and more than 30 detective novels based around a detective named Ota Fink, including Dark Well, Man-eater, Death of a Midget, Lady with a Green Elephant, Very Long Stairs, Murderer's Road, Estimated Solution and others.

Velinský founded a one-man publishing house, the Club of Friends of Captain Kid, the club referring to readers of his books and fans of his music. He used the club's data and close contact with his audience to better plan his production. This concerned not just published books and CDs, but deciding between writing music or literature and also selecting themes. The result was a publishing house producing new original books and songs "on demand".

He was also a miner, metalsmith, and graphic artist.

Velinský died of lung cancer in Ústí nad Labem in February 2012, aged 79.
