= Table of historic and prehistoric climate indicators =

This table is a reference tool for rapidly locating Wikipedia articles on Historic and Prehistoric climate indicators of all types.

Method	Type	Basis	Interpret	Instruments	Back To
Varve Analysis	Geological	Annual bands of seasonally differing particle size in glacial lake deposits	Samples carry Proxies. Thicker bands = warmer, wetter weather	Visual and Microscope	ca 13,000 yrs BP
Dendroclimatology	Biological	Annual bands of seasonally differing woody growth tissue in trees	Thicker bands = warmer and/or wetter weather, although some studies found thinner trunks for higher temperatures	Visual and Microscope	ca 10,000 yrs BP
Ice cores	Geological	Annual (or periodic) layers of differing ice crystals in glaciers and ice caps	Samples carry Proxies. Thicker bands = snowier weather	Chemical and Mass Spectrometer	ca 800,000 yrs BP
Speleothems	Geological	Layers of seasonally differing stalagmite/stalactite deposits in limestone caves	Samples carry Proxies. Thicker bands = warmer, wetter surface weather	Visual and Microscope	ca 500,000 yrs BP
Sun Spots	Astronomical	Number of spots visible on the surface of the Sun over various periods	More spots = warmer weather cycles (this is controversial)	Visual and Telescope	1700 AD
Oxygen Isotope Analysis, see marine isotope stage	Geochemical Climate Proxy	Ratio of Oxygen-18 to Oxygen-16 in calcite from deep sea sediment, and coral cores	More Oxygen-18 = colder climatic periods	Mass Spectrometer	ca 542,000,000 yrs BP
Beryllium-10 Analysis	Geochemical Climate Proxy	Ratio of Beryllium-10 to daughter isotopes in dust from ice cores	Produced in atmosphere by cosmic rays and absorbed into the hydrologic cycle. Level of Beryllium-10 has been shown to closely match recent solar activity measured by sun spots	Mass Spectrometer	ca 80,000 yrs BP

To Add:

- Alkenone analysis
- TEX-86 analysis
- Nile river flood levels
- Trace mineral ratios in deltaic sediment
- Wildlife distribution
- Pollen analysis
- Historic storm-related sinkings
- Sea temperature and atmospheric pressure (ENSO)
- Scientific meteorological measurements (since 1800s)
  - air temperature
  - air pressure
  - wind speed and direction
- Ocean currents and marine productivity
- Flooding and drought observations on land
- Volcanic activity
- Elevated charcoal in lake sediments
- Sand dune activation records
- Eolian (wind-borne) sediment deposition

== See also ==
- Geologic time scale
- Glacial period
- Ice age
- Last Glacial Period
