= Vermeology =

Vermeology (from Latin vermes, worms) is the field of biology dedicated to the study of worms. A person who studies vermeology is referred to as a vermeologist.

The umbrella term "vermeology" has fallen out of common use, as the animals known as worms belong to multiple phyla that are not closely related. Subfields of vermeology include nematology, the study of nematodes, oligochaetology (also called lumbricology), the study of earthworms, and helminthology, which focuses on parasitic worms, also known as helminths. The field of malacology was also historically included within vermeology.

In 2002, Sydney Brenner, Robert Horvitz, and John Sulston were awarded the Nobel Prize in Psysiology or Medicine for their study of organ development and cell death using the worm C. elgans as part of their research.

== Works ==
The final book that Charles Darwin published in his lifetime, The Formation of Vegetable Mould, Through the Action of Worms, focused on bioturbation by earthworms.

The Natural History and Antiquities of Selbourne, by Englishman Gilbert White, included writings about worms.
