= Carphologia =

Lint-picking behavior

Carphologia (or carphology) is a lint-picking behavior that is often a symptom of a delirious state.

Often seen in delirious or semiconscious patients, carphologia describes the actions of picking or grasping at imaginary objects, as well as the patient's own clothes or bed linens. This can be a grave symptom in cases of extreme exhaustion or approaching death.

== Etymology ==
The word carphology is derived from the ancient Greek "καρφολογία" (karphologia), as a compound of the two Greek elements: "κάρΦος" (karphos, "straw"), and "λέγειν" (legein), here in its sense of "to collect" rather than the more usual sense of "to say, profess". Thus, carphology literally means "to behave as though one were collecting straw". This refers to the involuntary picking or grasping movements sometimes seen in delirious patients in exhaustion, stupor, or high fever.

== Synonyms ==
The Latin-derived equivalent is floccillation which derives from floccus, "a piece of wool or straw". The late Latin crocydismus, still used in continental European psychiatry, is also synonymous and derived from the ancient Greek "κροκύς" (krokus, "bit of fluff" or "dust"). It appears first in the writings of Aretaeus and later of Galen.
