= Ertar =

Ertar is an alternative reality project, created by a group of Czech science fiction fans, led by D.Cap. The theme evolved from work on an officially unrecognized fan magazine named Light Years (Svetelne roky), founded in 1982, that as mainly a means of information on science fiction movies seen abroad. From the year 1985 on regular meetings of the fan magazine readers (READERCON) were organised.

After November 1989 more science fiction films started to be accessible in Czechoslovakia and the fan club turned to a wider spectrum of activities. Though the film fan magazine continued its existence, the club activities were centered on creating a modern Utopian republic known as Ertar situated on a planet Ergea. Special conventions (ERCON) and new-year meetings (KVIDO) take place every year, contributing new facts to the mosaic of this parallel world.

Fan activities ("Ertology") are based on creating reports on a parallel world named Ertar, on the planet Ergea, manufacturing artifacts "brought" from there, and taking an active part in science fiction conventions. Honorary members of the fan club included famous Czech writer and musician Jaroslav Velinský (Kapitán Kid), whose songs were used in the "restoration" of some Ertarian artifacts. In the recent years the importance of the fan magazine Light Years is gaining again. Instead of providing a basic information of unavailable SF movies the magazine provides guiding in the growing pool of SF movies now available.
