= Paleophycology =

Study and identification of fossil algae

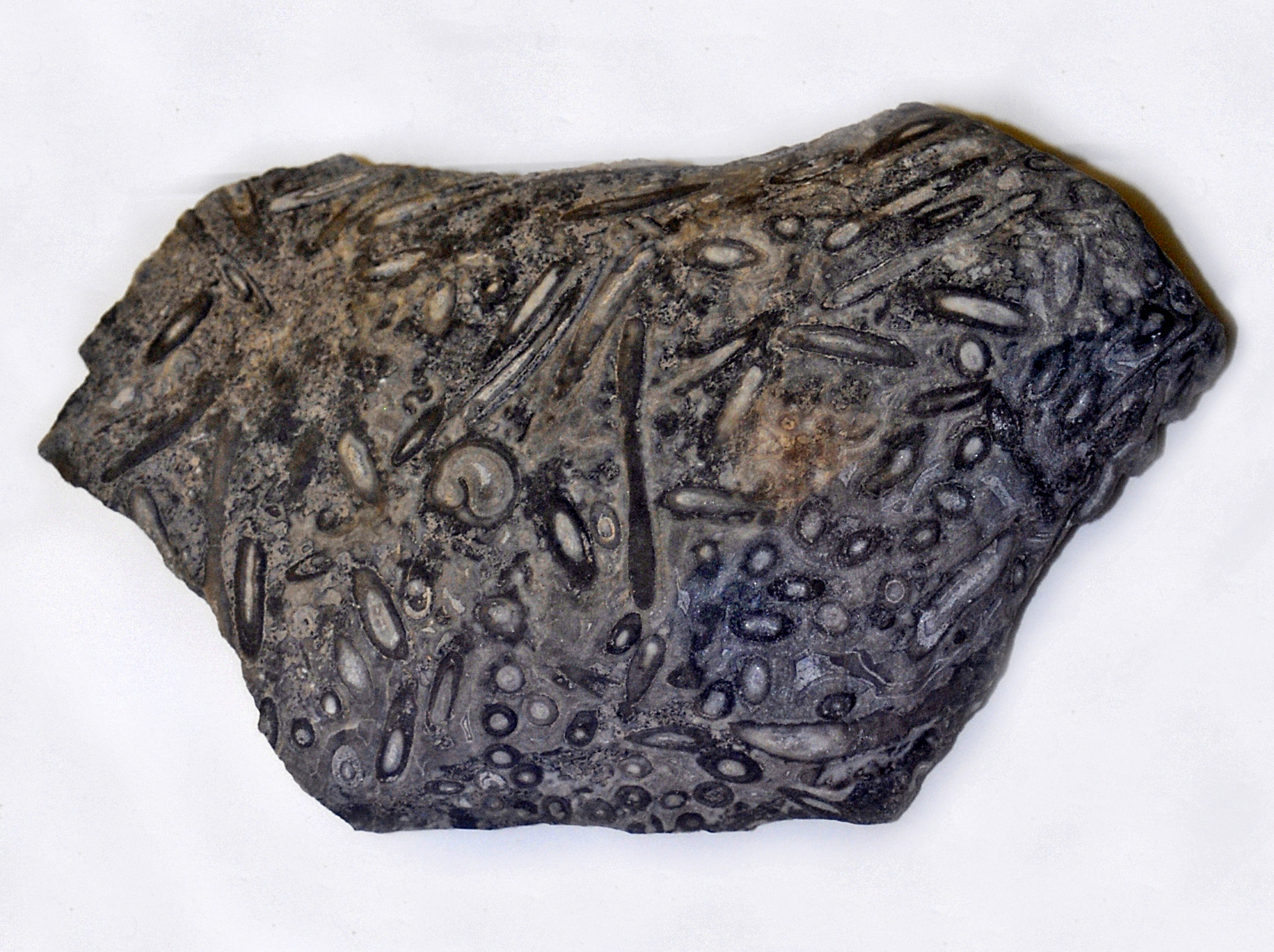
Fossil of Diplopora annulata, a shallow marine water green alga from Triassic of Italy

Paleophycology (also once known as paleoalgology) is the subdiscipline of paleobotany that deals with the study and identification of fossil algae and their evolutionary relationships and ecology.

The field is very important in the science of paleolimnology as the algae leave many indicators of fossil ecosystems. Primary and most familiar are both fossil shells from diatoms and biogeochemical traces of algal pigments in lake sediments. These fossils are clues to changes in nutrient availability and ecology of lakes.

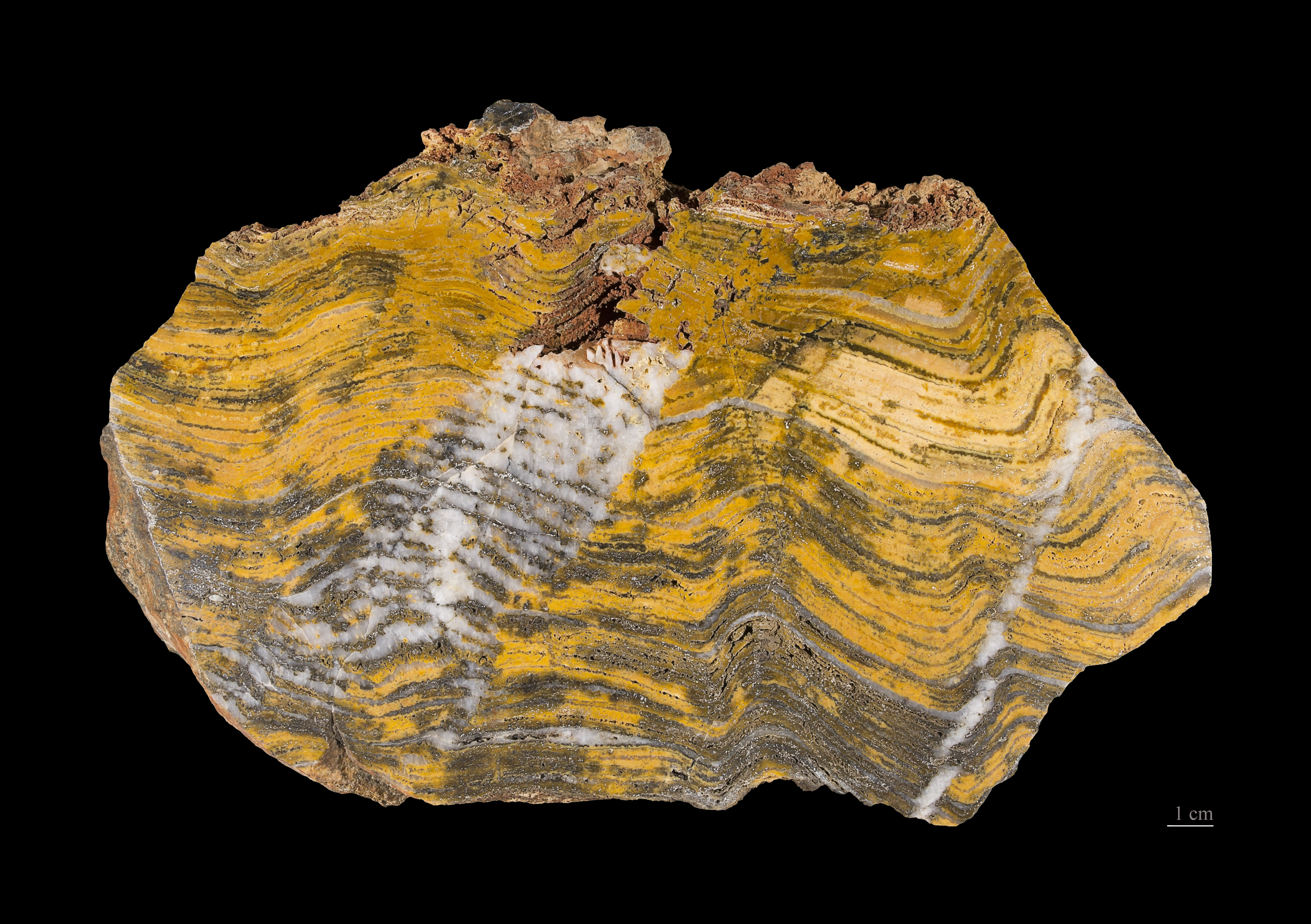
Fossil stromatolites from the Archaean Pilbara Craton of Western Australia

Some paleophycologists:

- John P. Smol, a Canadian paleolimnologist
- Stanley Awramik, an American Precambrian paleontologist
- Bruno R. C. Granier, a French stratigrapher and micropaleontologist
- Robert Riding, a British geologist and expert on calcareous algae and stromatolites
