= Book of prophecies =

A book of prophecies or chrismologion (also chresmologion; χρησμολόγιον; latinized chrismologium) is a genre of literature which collects prophecies or methods of divination.

Prophecies attributed to Merlin, first circulated separately as Prophetiae Merlini (c. 1130) before their inclusion in Geoffrey of Monmouth's Historia Regum Britanniae (c. 1136), shaped medieval views on fate and kingship. Allegorical visions, like the red and white dragons symbolizing Britons and Saxons, influenced Tudor propaganda, Arthurian legend, and esoteric traditions. Treated as both political tools and mystical revelations, they reinforced the myth of Britain’s destiny.

The chrismologion of Paisios Ligarides (c. 1652) was a collection of prophecies to the effect that the Russian Christians will defeat the Ottomans and liberate Constantinople are dedicated to the tsar. Similarly, a Russian translation of a 1673 Greek chrismologion was dedicated to the Tsar by Nikolai Spathari.

Bohemian astronomer Martin Horký published a series of almanachs entitled Chrysmologium Physico-Astromanticum during the years 1639–1645 containing both astronomical calculations and astrological predictions for the year in question.
