= Dendroarchaeology =

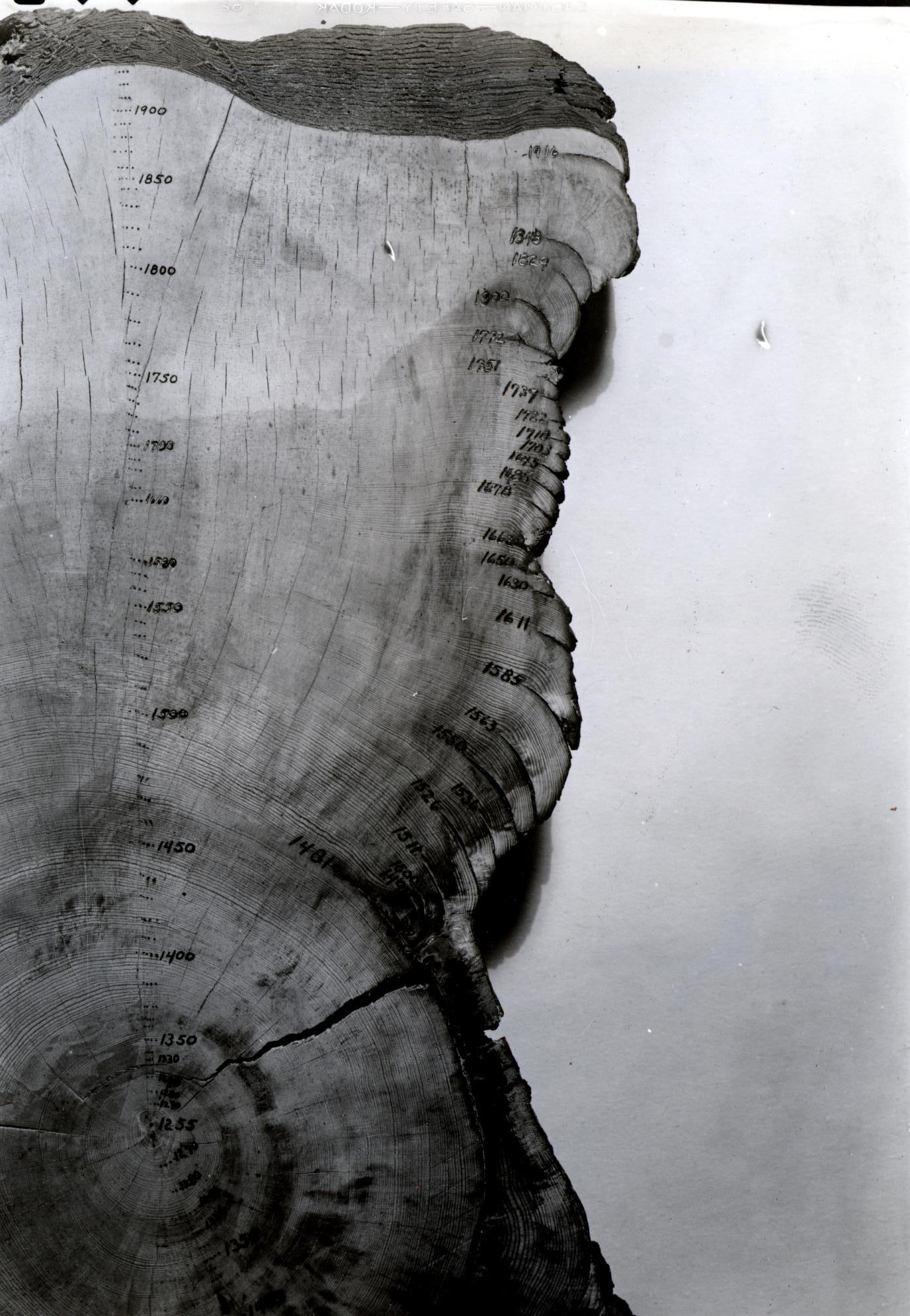
Pinus ponderosa stump section timeline

Dendroarchaeology is a term used for the study of vegetation remains, old buildings, artifacts, furniture, art and musical instruments using the techniques of dendrochronology (tree-ring dating). It refers to dendrochronological research of wood from the past regardless of its current physical context (in or above the soil). This form of dating is the most accurate and precise absolute dating method available to archaeologists, as the last ring that grew is the first year the tree could have been incorporated into an archaeological structure.

Tree-ring dating is useful in that it can contribute to chronometric, environmental, and behavioral archaeological research.

The utility of tree-ring dating in an environmental sense is the most applicable of the three in today's world. Tree rings can be used to reconstruct numerous environmental variables such as temperature, precipitation, stream flow, drought society, fire frequency and intensity, insect infestation, atmospheric circulation patterns, among others.

== History ==
At the beginning of the twentieth century, astronomer Andrew Ellicott Douglass first applied tree ring dating to prehistoric North American artifacts. Through applying dendrochronology (tree-ring dating), Douglass hoped for more expansive climate studies. Douglass theorized organic materials (trees and plant remains) could assist in visualizing past climates. Despite Dr. Douglass's contributions, archaeology as a discipline did not begin applying tree-ring dating until 1970s with Dr. Edward Cook and Dr. Gordon Jacoby. In 1929, American Southwestern archaeologists had charted a non continuous historic and prehistoric chronologies for the Chaco Canyon Region. Tree ring laboratory scientists from Columbia University were some of the first to apply tree-ring dating to the colonial period, specifically architectural timbers in the eastern United States. For agencies like the National Park Service and other historical societies, Dr. Jacoby and Cook began dating historic structures in the lower Hudson River Valley, New Jersey and Eastern Pennsylvania. This was difficult at the time due to a lack of sufficiently long master dating chronology and access to suitable structures. Not until 1998 was a Boston area master dating chronology developed. Today, the effectiveness of tree ring laboratory archaeological dating chronologies covers most of the area that was settled by the first European colonists. The numbers of these are in the hundreds and include historically significant structures such as Independence Hall and the Tuckahoe estate.

== Methodology ==
There are two types of dates that can be assigned to tree specimens: cutting dates, and noncutting dates. Which date is assigned to a specimen is dependent on whether or not there is evidence that the last ring present on the specimen was the last ring the tree grew before it died.

Cutting dates can be used for crossdated tree specimens that "possess evidence that the last ring present on the specimen was the last ring grown by the tree before it died."

Noncutting dates are used for crossdated tree specimens "if there is no evidence indicating that the last ring present on the specimen is the last one grown before the tree died." Patterns of tree growth will be similar between trees of the same species, growing in the same climate. These matching patterns align growth rings in different trees formed in the same year. Once aligned, knowing the precise calendar year of any individual tree-ring is the same as knowing the calendar year of all the rings. The goal of a dendroarchaeologist is to determine the year when the last ring was formed. Crossdating, the skill of finding matching ring-width patterns between tree-ring samples, is used to assign the precise calendar year to every ring. This is affected by the climate that the timber was in. It is also important to have enough rings to actually confirm a date. Once the rings are dates, the chronology is measured. The last step is to compare the rings with that of ring-width patterns in sampled timbers and a master dating chronology.

For trees to be useful in archaeological analysis, they must "produce annual growth rings that are uniform around the tree stem", they must "live for decades and, preferably, centuries" and they "must have been used extensively by humans either for habitation or fuel." One of the problems with this evaluation is that it is possible under certain conditions for a tree to miss a growth-ring or produce two growth rings in a season. During extreme drought there can be insufficient growth of xylem to form a noticeable ring. Alternatively, if a defoliating agent (e.g. drought, late frost, or insect damage) can arrest the growth of a tree early in a year, after which there is a secondary growth period of new foliage causing two rings to form. Another difficulty in the use of tree-ring dating as applied to archaeology is the variety and condition of wood used in construction of archaeological sites. Many such samples are encountered wet. Heartwood can normally retain much of its substance and can be dried out and polished for analysis. On the other hand, ancient wet sapwood samples seldom survive drying out. As a result, the sapwood should either be measured wet and then allowed to dry, or it should be frozen or kept wet.

In North America, "millennial-length chronologies have been developed for two species of bristlecone pine (Pinus longaeva in the Great Basin and Pinus aristata in the Rocky Mountains), bald cypress (Taxodium distichum), coast redwood (Sequoia sempervirens), Douglas-fir (Pseudotsuga menziesii), eastern cedar (Juniperus virginiana), juniper (Juniperus sp.), Larch (Larix sp.), lodgepole pine (Pinus contorta), limber pine (Pinus flexilis), mountain hemlock (Tsuga mertensiana), ponderosa pine (Pinus ponderosa), and giant sequoia (Sequoiadendron giganteum) (Jacoby, 2000a)."

"In the southern hemisphere, successful crossdating has been achieved on alerce (Fitroya cupressoides) and pehuen (Araucaria araucana), also known as 'Chilean pine' or the 'monkey puzzle tree,' specimens in South America, kauri (Agathis australis) specimens in New Zealand, clanwilliam cedar (Widdringtonia cedarbergensis) specimens in Australia and Tasmania, and huon pine (Lagarostrobus franklinii) in Tasmania (Jacoby, 2000al; Norton, 1990)."

== Application ==
The main application of tree research laboratory science or dendroarchaeology is to produce records of past climates that might be unavailable otherwise. Timber remains give insight into what little remains of our national forests prior to colonial settlement. This also benefits the sciences of paleoclimatology.

Dendrochronological dating is potentially applicable wherever trees were growing, except in tropical regions. For use in absolute dating of archaeological sites, it is partially limited by the availability of a master reference chronology for the region concerned. If there is a gap in the chronology (e.g. the inability to use a chronology constructed from pine samples in the British Isle prior to the 17th century due to the lack of use of pine in architecture then) then absolute dating cannot be applied. Additionally, non-climatic influences can also affect the tree-ring pattern of timber samples. Even if a reference chronology is available, care must be taken to identify aberrations in the ring pattern to determine if the sample is usable for dating.

Dendroarchaeology has been used extensively in the dating of historical buildings. After cross-matching the chronology from the building with the chronology of living trees, it is immediately possible to figure out the dates at which the historic timbers used in construction were felled. Archaeologists at Chaco Canyon, New Mexico used tree-ring dating and found structure remains originated fifty miles south from the Zuni Mountains. Similarly, if an extended chronology is available, then dating of samples from buildings of known or unknown date is possible. However, a limiting aspect of this application becomes apparent when dating medieval buildings. In such buildings, many timber samples lack completeness out to the underbark surface which can make the task of determining the felling year much more difficult.

The application of dendroarchaeology in uncovering past trade patterns is based on determining the provenance of the tree-ring patterns. This is called dendroprovenance (or dendroprovenancing). Patterns from individual samples will match much more closely with chronologies of tree-ring series from the same area than with chronologies from other regions. For example, strong cross dating is found between Irish and English chronologies, but individual ring patterns tend to match better against their local chronologies. Hence, this strong geographical component of tree ring chronologies can be used to source timber samples at archaeological sites to uncover trade routes required for the site construction. Dendroprovenance hase been successfully applied to for example European wood from the Roman period and medieval times, but also to Kauri timbers from New Zealand.

Dendrochronology can also be used in concert with radiocarbon dating to allow for more accurate date measurements using radiocarbon dating on archaeological sites. It is known that the concentration of carbon-14 in the atmosphere is not constant. By performing radiocarbon dating on timber samples in a known chronology, radiocarbon dates can be plotted against real time generating a calibration curve that can be used for future radiocarbon samples. Floating dendrochronological sequences can be fixed by spikes of cosmogenic radiocarbon caused by Miyake events, such as timber in the Dispilio archaeological site in northern Greece, which was dated to building phases between 5328 and 5140 BCE based on a Miyake event in 5259 BCE.

While dendrochronology is often considered as an absolute dating method, it can also be used as a powerful tool in the relative dating of an archaeological site. Timber samples may be able to be compared with others on the site to help construct a timeline of events for that particular site. Such samples can also be used to settle issues in constructing a chronological typology for artifacts found on site. The important point is that such within-site analysis can be done whether or not a chronology is available to date the whole assemblage.

== Archaeological Dendroclimatology ==
Dr. A.E. Douglass primary goal for early dendrochronology applications was understanding prehistoric climates. Today, many archaeologists utilize tree-ring dating for insights on past environmental conditions. Tree ring patterns can reflect past earthquakes, volcanic activity, fires, and insect infestations. Dendroclimatology is a sub-discipline of dendrochronology and dendroarchaeology that utilizes research methods for climate analysis. Dendroclimatology research has charted humidity changes in the American southwest since 1600.

== See also ==
- Archaeology
