= Jean C. Baudet =

Belgian philosopher and writer (1944–2021)

- Born: Jean Claude Baudet; May 31, 1944; Brussels, Nazi-occupied Belgium
- Died: July 18, 2021 (aged 77); Laeken, Belgium
- Occupations: Philosopher; writer

Philosophical work
- Era: Contemporary philosophy
- Region: Western philosophy
- School: Editology

Jean Claude Baudet (May 31, 1944 – July 18, 2021) was a Belgian philosopher and writer.

== Life ==
J.C. Baudet taught philosophy and history of science, from 1966 to 1973, in Congo and Burundi. From 1973 to 1978, he was a biology researcher (agronomy faculty of Gembloux and Paris VI). In 1978, he was the founder of the periodical Technologia (history of Science-Technics-Industry). Since 1996, he was an editor of the Revue Générale (Brussels). The philosophical system developed by J.C. Baudet is known as editology.

== Theories ==
=== Science-Technics-Industry ===
Science-Technics-Industry (STI) is a philosophical concept proposed by the Belgian philosopher Jean C. Baudet. The objective of STI is to distinguish rational cultural productions from emotional or imaginary ones. Emotional and imaginary cultural productions lead to ideologies and/or ethical and politically illusive constructions. STI is a key concept in editology. It may be seen as an elaborate philosophical generalization of the economic notion of science and industry. In the STI, technics are the interface between science and industry, and thus between knowledge (truth) and practice (efficiency).

=== Editology ===
Editology (French: éditologie) is the epistemological system developed by Baudet. The main characteristic of the editology is to define the knowledge as a set of texts, discourses (and thus terms), and to assign the scientificity of those texts to the very conditions of their edition - the manner they are accepted by the international scientific community. It has two purposes: understand the terms (terminology) and analyze the edition (editology sensu stricto).

This philosophical approach leads to a conception of the knowledge (an truth) which admits that the hard core of rationalism (logic) is the epistemological complex STI (Science-Technics-Industry). An important consequence of the editological thought is to establish an historical critic of the successive discourses which characterize the milestones of the human thinking: literature, religion, and later philosophy. In that sense, philosophy is defined as a discourse rejecting all the discourses.

== Bibliography ==
- Les céréales mineures, ACCT, Paris, 1981.
- Les ingénieurs belges, APPS, Brussels, 1986.
- Nouvel abrégé d'histoire des mathématiques, Vuibert, Paris, 2002.
- De l'outil à la machine, Vuibert, Paris, 2003.
- De la machine au système, Vuibert, Paris, 2004.
- Penser la matière. Une histoire de la chimie, Vuibert, Paris, 2004.
- Mathématique et vérité. Une philosophie du nombre, L'Harmattan, Paris, 2005.
- Le signe de l'humain. Une philosophie de la technique, L'Harmattan, Paris, 2005.
- Penser le vivant. Une histoire de la médecine et de la biologie, Vuibert, Paris, 2005.
- Une philosophie de la poésie. Entre poème et théorème, L'Harmattan, Paris, 2006.
- Penser le monde. Une histoire de la physique, Vuibert, Paris, 2006.
- La vie expliquée par la chimie, Vuibert, Paris, 2006.
- Histoire des sciences et de l'industrie en Belgique, Jourdan, Brussels, 2007.
- Expliquer l'Univers, Vuibert, Paris, 2008.
- A la découverte des éléments de la matière, Vuibert, Paris, 2009.
- Curieuses histoires de la science. Quand les chercheurs se trompent, Jourdan, Brussels, 2010.
- A quoi pensent les Belges, Jourdan, Brussels, 2010.
- Curieuses histoires des dames de la science, Jourdan, Brussels, 2010.
- Curieuses histoires de la pensée, Jourdan, Brussels, 2011.
- Curieuses histoires des inventions, Jourdan, Brussels, 2011.
- Curieuses histoires des entreprises, Jourdan, Brussels, 2012.
- Histoire de la pensée de l'an Un à l'an Mil, Jourdan, Brussels, 2013.
- La vie des grands philosophes, Jourdan, Brussels, 2013.
- Histoire de la cuisine. Une philosophie du goût, Jourdan, Brussels, 2013.
- Les agitateurs d'idées en France, La Boîte à Pandore, Brussels, 2014.
- Histoire des mathématiques, Vuibert, Paris, 2014.
- Les plus grands Belges, La Boîte à Pandore, Paris, 2014.
- Les plus grands ingénieurs beges, La Boîte à Pandore, Paris, 2014.
- Histoire de la physique, Vuibert, Paris, 2015.
