= Glyptology =

Study of engraved gems

Glyptology is the study of engraved gems, or of engravings on gems.

Glytptology was popularized by Maxwell Sommerville, a 19th-century scholar and collector. He was the first and only Professor of Glyptology at the University of Pennsylvania and amassed an extensive collection of engraved gems during his travels. his work and dedication brought significant attention to this field

== Notable people ==
- Sir John Boardman
- Diana Scarisbrick
- Gertrud Seidmann
- Martin Henig
- Jean-François Champollion
- Adolf Furtwängler

== See also ==
- Archaeology
- Gemology
- Mogul Mughal Emerald, a large emerald with much engraved text
