= Textology =

Textology may refer to:

- Textual studies, or textual scholarship in general, an umbrella term for disciplines that study texts
- Textual criticism, a field of study which seeks to (re)construct the original form of a historical text
- Textual analysis, an aspect of content analysis, focused on texts as artifacts of communication
- Textual linguistics, a branch of linguistics analysing the grammar of texts as communication systems

== See also ==
- Text
- Tektology
