= Cryopedology =

Cryopedology is any study relating to soils at temperatures below 0 degrees Celsius, with a focus on intensive frost action and permanently frozen ground, permafrost, or perennially frozen ground, pergelisol. This includes their formation, decay, causes, occurrences, and engineering practices used to overcome difficulties from such frost action. The term cryopedology was first introduced by geologist Kirk Bryan in 1946. Economic interests from road and facilities construction in the Arctic drive this area of study.

The shapes into which frozen snow is blown by the wind (e.g. on the tundra) are said to be 'cryopedological formations'. The ways in which frozen snow behaves due to factors intrinsic to itself and relating to environments are 'cryopedological processes'.
