= Docimology =

Docimology is a specialized field of pedagogy and psychology that focuses on the systematic study, analysis, and improvement of evaluation and testing processes in education. As a scientific discipline, it seeks to ensure that assessment methods are not only accurate and fair but also appropriate for measuring students' performance, knowledge, and skills.

== Overview ==
The term "docimology" derives from the Greek words dokimos ("tested, proven") and logos ("study"), signifying "the study of testing." Henri Piéron (1881–1964), a distinguished French psychologist and educator, is widely regarded as the founder of docimology. He was one of the first to systematically analyze educational evaluation and its psychological and social impacts on students and teachers. Piéron highlighted the critical role of objectivity and reliability in assessments, laying the groundwork for subsequent research in this area.

Docimology is intrinsically connected to the concept of assessment for learning, emphasizing the use of evaluation not merely as a tool for measuring knowledge but as a means to enhance and support student learning. By focusing on formative assessments, it transforms evaluation into an instrument for fostering personal growth and educational improvement.

In contemporary practice, docimology has evolved significantly, shaped by technological innovations and advancements in educational science. Beyond traditional education, it now plays a vital role in professional certification, employee recruitment, and psychological testing, promoting fairness and effectiveness across diverse domains.

== Modern developments ==
The integration of digital technologies has revolutionized docimology. Online testing platforms and artificial intelligence (AI) tools enable more precise and transparent assessments by reducing human error and bias. For instance, AI-driven analytics can identify patterns in student responses, offering insights that help educators tailor their teaching strategies. These innovations have expanded the scope of docimology, making it a cornerstone of contemporary evaluation practices across educational and professional settings.

== Key research areas ==
Docimology encompasses several critical dimensions of assessment:

- Test standardization: Creating consistent and comparable evaluation tools to minimize subjective biases and ensure uniformity across diverse educational settings.
- Measurement methods: Employing scientifically validated techniques to guarantee fairness and objectivity in the assessment process.
- Validity and reliability: Ensuring that assessments accurately measure the intended constructs (validity) and yield consistent results over repeated applications (reliability).
- Statistical analysis: Applying advanced statistical models to interpret assessment data, identify trends, and improve the reliability of evaluation systems.
- Ethical considerations: Addressing ethical concerns by designing assessments that promote equity, inclusivity, and fairness, avoiding favoritism or discrimination.
- Technological integration: Leveraging cutting-edge tools, such as AI algorithms and adaptive testing software, to enhance the efficiency, precision, and accessibility of evaluation processes.

== Broader applications ==
Docimology extends its relevance beyond traditional classrooms. In professional contexts, it informs the design of aptitude tests and certifications that ensure candidates meet industry standards. Similarly, in psychological evaluation, it helps develop tools for diagnosing and understanding cognitive and behavioral traits.

By bridging education, technology, and psychology, docimology remains a dynamic and interdisciplinary field, continuously adapting to meet the challenges of a rapidly changing world. Its ongoing evolution underscores its central role in creating fairer, more reliable, and impactful systems of assessment.

== See also ==
- Educational assessment
