= Orthology (language) =

Orthology or ortholinguistics is a largely obsolete term used in early 20th-century linguistics and language reform movements to refer to the study of correct or standardized language use. The term derives from Greek ortho- 'correct' and -logia 'study'. It was notably developed by C. K. Ogden, who used it in a specialized sense within his broader work on semantics and language reform. Ogden’s work led to the establishment of the Orthological Institute in 1927 and was closely connected to the development of Basic English.

In psycholinguistics, ortholinguistic processing refers to processing the semantic content of language, in contrast to paralinguistic information such as emotional prosody and facial expressions.
