= Sociopolitical typology =

Types of a political organization

Sociopolitical typology refers to four types, or levels, of a political organization: "band", "tribe", "chiefdom", and "state", created by the anthropologist Elman Service.

== Overview ==
Service's work is fundamental to cultural materialism, one among several influential paradigms in modern anthropology. Ethnographic and archaeological studies in hundreds of places have revealed many correlations between economy and social and political organizations. These types correlate with adaptive strategies or economic typology.

Thus, foragers as an economic type tend to have band organization. Similarly, many pastoralists and horticulturalists have lived in tribal societies or, more simply, tribes. While most chiefdoms had farming economies, herding was important in some of the Middle Eastern chiefdoms. The non-industrial states usually had an agricultural base. With food production come larger, denser populations and more complex economies than are found among foragers. New regulatory problems were created by these features and that gave rise to more complex relations and linkages.

- foragers (hunter-gatherer): band society
- horticulture: tribe
- pastoralism: chiefdom
- agriculture: state

There have been many sociopolitical trends reflecting the increased regulatory demands associated with food production. Archaeologists study these trends through time, and cultural anthropologists observe them among contemporary groups.
