= Farm typology =

The USDA's Economic Research Service (ERS) has developed a farm typology, or farm classification, that divides the 2.1 million U.S. farms into 8 mutually exclusive and relatively homogeneous groups:

1. limited resource farms
2. retirement farms
3. residential/lifestyle farms
4. farming occupation/lower sales
5. farming occupation/high sales
6. large family farms
7. very large family farms
8. nonfamily farms.

Also, the eight categories can be collapsed into 3:

1. rural residence farms
2. intermediate farms
3. commercial farms

Data for 2003 indicate that Commercial farms, those having sales of $250,000 or more annually, constitute 9% of all farms and account for 72% of production. Intermediate farms, constituting 24% of all farms, account for 19% of production. The largest number of farms, characterized as rural residence farms, constitute 68% of all farms and account for 8% of production.

== See also ==
- Small farm
