= Typology (urban planning and architecture) =

Classification of buildings and urban places

Typology is the study and classification of object types. In urban planning and architecture, typology refers to the task of identifying and grouping buildings and urban spaces according to the similarity of their essential characteristics.

Common examples of essential characteristics include intensity of development (from rural to suburban to urban) and building use (church, hospital, school, apartment, house, etc.) Non-essential characteristics are those which, if modified, would not change the building type. Color, for example, would rarely be considered an essential characteristic of building type. Material, however, may or may not be considered essential depending on how integral the material is to the structure (engineering) and construction (assembly) of the building.

Building types may be further divided into subtypes. For example, among religious structures there are churches and mosques, etc.; among churches there are cathedrals and chapels, etc.; among cathedrals there are gothic and romanesque, etc.

In architecture and urban planning discourse, typology is sometimes distinguished from morphology, which is the study and classification of buildings according to their shape or form (gk. morph). When this dichotomy is employed between typology and morphology, the term typology tends to refer to the more limited aspects of buildings or urban sites specifically related to their use. In other words: typology is use-based classification; morphology is form-based classification.

This distinction is particularly relevant in urban planning and design, where some have begun to question the standard model of single-use zoning codes in favor of form-based zoning codes that regulate development not by use (commercial, residential, industrial, etc) but instead by the shape, size, and placement of buildings on their lots.

== See also ==
- Pattern language
- Typology (archaeology)
