= Logology (theology) =

Study of words in search for divine truth

In theology, logology deals with the verbal nature of doctrines in suggesting a further possibility that there may be analogies between "logology" and theology. According to literary theorist Kenneth Burke, logology works through the forms of religious language and its functions in the political sphere when rhetoric acts as a symbolic action. If it is true that language is symbolic, then speech is the result of man acting as a symbol-using animal, making it necessary to understand that logology can also be defined as the study of "words about words".

In rhetoric, logology focuses not in finding the truth or falseness of a statement or phrase, but rather why that particular word or string of words was chosen and how those choices influenced the way those words were interpreted and understood by the receiver. There is a belief that there is an analogy between the words chosen and the word that those words express.

For example, if theology is discourse concerning God, then there is a difference between "God" and the word "God". In relating the definition of logology to the term "theology", it then becomes clear that the correct meaning of theology is not "words about God" but instead "words about the word God".
