= Splanchnology =

Study of the visceral organs

Splanchnology is the study of the visceral organs, i.e. digestive, urinary, reproductive and respiratory systems.

The term derives from the Neo-Latin splanchno-, from the Greek σπλάγχνα, meaning "viscera". More broadly, splanchnology includes all the components of the Neuro-Endo-Immune (NEI) Supersystem. An organ (or viscus) is a collection of tissues joined in a structural unit to serve a common function. In anatomy, a viscus is an internal organ, and viscera is the plural form. Organs consist of different tissues, one or more of which prevail and determine its specific structure and function. Functionally related organs often cooperate to form whole organ systems.

Viscera are the soft organs of the body. There are organs and systems of organs that differ in structure and development but they are united for the performance of a common function. Such functional collection of mixed organs, form an organ system. These organs are always made up of special cells that support its specific function. The normal position and function of each visceral organ must be known before the abnormal can be ascertained.

Healthy organs all work together cohesively and gaining a better understanding of how, helps to maintain a healthy lifestyle. Some functions cannot be accomplished only by one organ. That is why organs form complex systems. The system of organs is a collection of homogeneous organs, which have a common plan of structure, function, development, and they are connected to each other anatomically and communicate through the NEI supersystem.
