= Dendroclimatology =

Science of determining past climates from trees

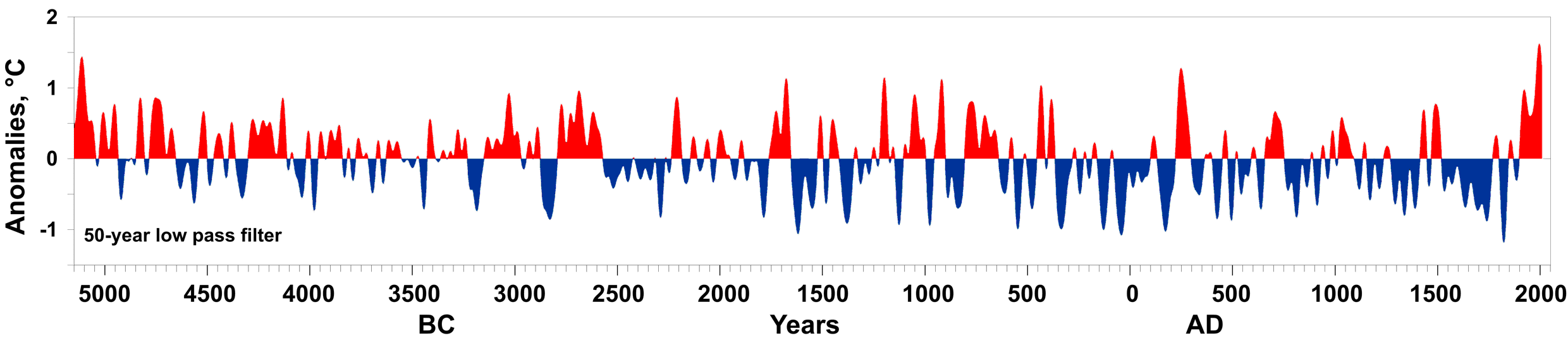
Variation of tree ring width translated into summer temperature anomalies for the past 7000 years, based on samples from holocene deposits on Yamal Peninsula and Siberian now living conifers.

Dendroclimatology is the science of determining past climates from trees (primarily properties of the annual tree rings). Tree rings are wider when conditions favor growth, narrower when times are difficult. Other properties of the annual rings, such as maximum latewood density (MXD) have been shown to be better proxies than simple ring width. Using tree rings, scientists have estimated many local climates for hundreds to thousands of years previous. By combining multiple tree-ring studies (sometimes with other climate proxy records), scientists have estimated past regional and global climates.

== Advantages ==
Tree rings are especially useful as climate proxies in that they can be well-dated via dendrochronology, i.e. matching of the rings from sample to sample. This allows extension backwards in time using deceased tree samples, even using samples from buildings or from archeological digs. Another advantage of tree rings is that they are clearly demarked in annual increments, as opposed to other proxy methods such as boreholes. Furthermore, tree rings respond to multiple climatic effects (temperature, moisture, cloudiness), so that various aspects of climate (not just temperature) can be studied. However, this can be a double-edged sword.

== Limitations ==
Along with the advantages of dendroclimatology are some limitations: confounding factors, geographic coverage, annular resolution, and collection difficulties. The field has developed various methods to partially adjust for these challenges.

=== Confounding factors ===
There are multiple climate and non-climate factors as well as nonlinear effects that impact tree ring width. Methods to isolate single factors (of interest) include botanical studies to calibrate growth influences and sampling of "limiting stands" (those expected to respond mostly to the variable of interest).

==== Climate factors ====
Climate factors that affect trees include temperature, precipitation, sunlight, and wind. To differentiate among these factors, scientists collect information from "limiting stands." An example of a limiting stand is the upper elevation treeline: here, trees are expected to be more affected by temperature variation (which is "limited") than precipitation variation (which is in excess). Conversely, lower elevation treelines are expected to be more affected by precipitation changes than temperature variation. This is not a perfect work-around as multiple factors still impact trees even at the "limiting stand," but it helps. In theory, collection of samples from nearby limiting stands of different types (e.g. upper and lower treelines on the same mountain) should allow mathematical solution for multiple climate factors.

==== Non-climate factors ====
Non-climate factors include soil, tree age, fire, tree-to-tree competition, genetic differences, logging or other human disturbance, herbivore impact (particularly sheep grazing), pest outbreaks, disease, and CO_{2} concentration. For factors which vary randomly over space (tree to tree or stand to stand), the best solution is to collect sufficient data (more samples) to compensate for confounding noise. Tree age is corrected for with various statistical methods: either fitting spline curves to the overall tree record or using similar aged trees for comparison over different periods (regional curve standardization). Careful examination and site selection helps to limit some confounding effects, for example picking sites undisturbed by modern man.

==== Non-linear effects ====
In general, climatologists assume a linear dependence of ring width on the variable of interest (e.g. moisture). However, if the variable changes enough, response may level off or even turn opposite. The home gardener knows that one can underwater or overwater a house plant. In addition, it is possible that interaction effects may occur (for example "temperature times precipitation" may affect growth as well as temperature and precipitation on their own. Also, the "limiting stand" helps somewhat to isolate the variable of interest. For instance, at the upper treeline, where the tree is "cold limited", it's unlikely that nonlinear effects of high temperature ("inverted quadratic") will have a numerically significant impact on ring width over the course of a growing season.

==== Botanical inferences to correct for confounding factors ====
Botanical studies can help to estimate the impact of confounding variables and in some cases guide corrections for them. These experiments may be either ones where growth variables are all controlled (e.g. in a greenhouse), partially controlled (e.g. FACE [Free Airborne Concentration Enhancement] experiments—add ref), or where conditions in nature are monitored. In any case, the important thing is that multiple growth factors are carefully recorded to determine what impacts growth. (Insert Fennoscandanavia paper reference). With this information, ring width response can be more accurately understood and inferences from historic (unmonitored) tree rings become more certain. In concept, this is like the limiting stand principle, but it is more quantitative—like a calibration.

==== Divergence Problematics ====
The divergence problem is the disagreement between the temperatures measured by the thermometers (instrumental temperatures) on one side, and the temperatures reconstructed from the latewood density or width of tree rings on the other side, at many treeline sites in northern forests.

While the rendering and analysis of data from thermometer records largely suggest a substantial warming trend, tree rings from these particular sites do not display a corresponding change in their maximum latewood density or, in some cases, their width. This does not apply to all such studies. Where this applies, a temperature trend extracted from tree rings alone would not show any substantial warming. The temperature graphs calculated from instrumental temperatures and from these tree ring proxies thus "diverge" from one another since the 1950s, which is the origin of the term. This divergence raises obvious questions of whether other, unrecognized divergences have occurred in the past, prior to the era of thermometers. There is evidence suggesting that the divergence is caused by human activities, and so confined to the recent past, but use of affected proxies can lead to overestimation of past temperatures, understating the current warming trend. There is continuing research into explanations and ways to reconcile this the discrepancy between analysis of tree ring data and thermometer based data.

=== Geographic coverage ===
Trees do not cover the Earth. Polar and marine climates cannot be estimated from tree rings. In perhumid tropical regions, Australia and southern Africa, trees generally grow all year round and don't show clear annual rings. In some forest areas, the tree growth is too much influenced by multiple factors (no "limiting stand") to allow clear climate reconstruction. The coverage difficulty is dealt with by acknowledging it and by using other proxies (e.g. ice cores, corals) in difficult areas. In some cases it can be shown that the parameter of interest (temperature, precipitation, etc.) varies similarly from area to area, for example by looking at patterns in the instrumental record. Then one is justified in extending the dendroclimatology inferences to areas where no suitable tree ring samples are obtainable.

=== Annular resolution ===
Tree rings show the impact on growth over an entire growing season. Climate changes deep in the dormant season (winter) will not be recorded. In addition, different times of the growing season may be more important than others (i.e. May versus September) for ring width. However, in general the ring width is used to infer the overall climate change during the corresponding year (an approximation). Another problem is "memory" or autocorrelation. A stressed tree may take a year or two to recover from a hard season. This problem can be dealt with by more complex modeling (a "lag" term in the regression) or by reducing the skill estimates of chronologies.

=== Collection difficulties ===
Tree rings must be obtained from nature, frequently from remote regions. This means that special efforts are needed to map sites properly. In addition, samples must be collected in difficult (often sloping terrain) conditions. Generally, tree rings are collected using a hand-held borer device, that requires skill to get a good sample. The best samples come from felling a tree and sectioning it. However, this requires more danger and does damage to the forest. It may not be allowed in certain areas, particularly with the oldest trees in undisturbed sites (which are the most interesting scientifically). As with all experimentalists, dendroclimatologists must, at times, decide to make the best of imperfect data, rather than resample. This tradeoff is made more difficult, because sample collection (in the field) and analysis (in the lab) may be separated significantly in time and space. These collection challenges mean that data gathering is not as simple or cheap as conventional laboratory science.

== Other measurements ==
Initial work focused on measuring the tree ring width—this is simple to measure and can be related to climate parameters. But the annual growth of the tree leaves other traces. In particular maximum latewood density (MXD) is another metric used for estimating environmental variables. It is, however, harder to measure. Other properties (e.g. isotope or chemical trace analysis) have also been tried most notably by L. M. Libby in her 1974 paper "Temperature Dependence of Isotope Ratios in Tree Rings". In theory, multiple measurements on the same ring will allow differentiation of confounding factors (e.g. precipitation and temperature). However, most studies are still based on ring widths at limiting stands.

Measuring radiocarbon concentrations in tree rings has proven to be useful in recreating past sunspot activity, with data now extending back over 11,000 years.

European winter storms can also be recorded by growth ring anomalies.

== See also ==
- Paleoclimatology
- Table of historic and prehistoric climate indicators
- Temperature record of the last 2,000 years
- Varve
