= Paleontology =

Study of past life through fossils

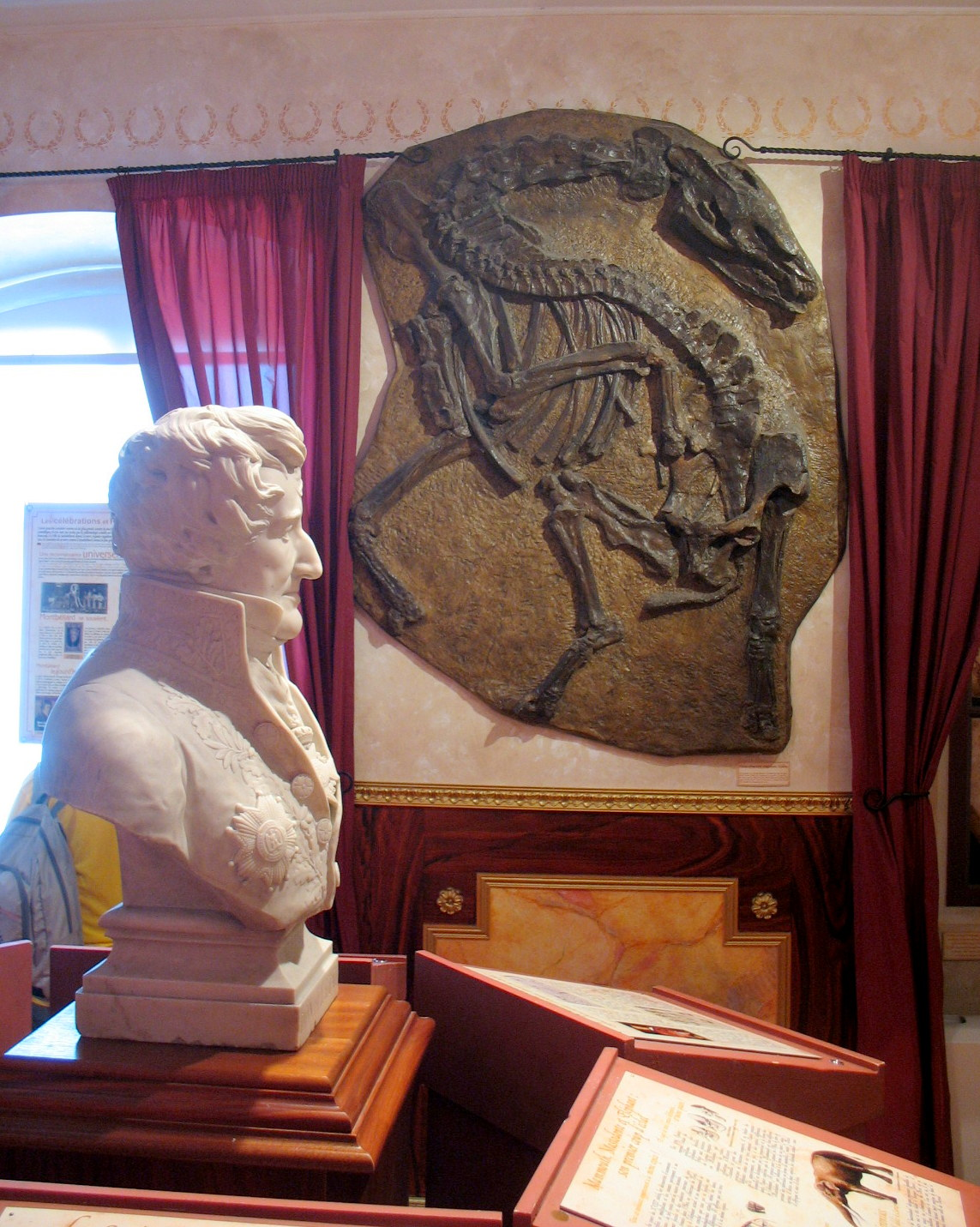
Bust of the paleontologist Georges Cuvier (left) and a cast skeleton of Palaeotherium magnum (named by Cuvier in 1804, right), Cuvier Museum of Montbéliard

Paleontology or palaeontology is the scientific study of the life of the past, mainly but not exclusively through the study of fossils. Paleontologists use fossils as a means to classify organisms, measure geologic time, and assess the interactions between prehistoric organisms and their natural environment. While paleontological observations are known from at least the 6th century BC, the foundation of paleontology as a science dates back to the work of Georges Cuvier in 1796. Cuvier demonstrated evidence for the concept of extinction and how the life of the past was not necessarily the same as that of the present. The field developed rapidly over the course of the following decades, and the French word paléontologie was introduced for the study in 1822, which was derived from the Ancient Greek word for 'ancient' and words describing relatedness and a field of study. Further advances in the field accompanied the work of Charles Darwin who popularized the concept of evolution. Together, evolution and extinction can be understood as complementary processes that shaped the history of life.

Paleontology overlaps the most with the fields of geology and biology. It draws on technology and analysis of a wide range of sciences to apply them to the study of life and environments of the past, particularly for the subdisciplines of paleobiology and paleoecology that are analogous to biology and ecology. Paleontology also contributes to other sciences, being utilized for biostratigraphy to reconstruct the geologic time scale of Earth, or in studies on extinction to establish both external and internal factors that can lead to the disappearance of a species. Much of the history of life is now better understood because of advances in paleontology and the increase in interdisciplinary studies. Several improvements in understanding have occurred from the introduction of theoretical analysis to paleontology in the 1950s and 1960s which led to the rise of more focused fields of paleontology that assess the changing geography and climate of Earth, the phylogenetic relationships between different species, and the analysis of how fossilization occurs and what biases can impact the quality of the fossil record.

Paleontology is also one of the most high profile of the sciences, comparable to astrophysics and global health in the amount of attention in mass media. Public attention to paleontology can be traced back to the mythologies of indigenous peoples of many continents and the interpretation of discovered fossils as the bones of dragons or giants. Prehistoric life is used as the inspiration for toys, television and film, computer games, and tourism, with the budgets for these public projects often exceeding the funding within the field of paleontology itself.

== Concept ==
Paleontology (also spelled palaeontology) is the study of life of the past, characterized but not defined by the study and interpretation of fossils. It overlaps with the fields of geology and biology especially, but also with ecology, chemistry, physics and mathematics. Paleontology consists of both conceptual theorizing and focused scientific study. Traditionally, the sub-field of invertebrate paleontology has been closely tied to the study of geology, biostratigraphy, and historical geology, which have both commercial and academic drivers, whereas vertebrate paleontology has been more closely tied to biology with limited commercial applications. Both areas of study have broadened over time as a result of developing technology, but the "classical" requirements of fieldwork, laboratory preparation, and study of comparative anatomy remain core components of most sub-fields of paleontology. Paleontological study provides a direct source of information on the anatomy, physiology, ecology, and chronology of life on Earth, and the fossil record can be used to test hypotheses relevant to a range of scientific disciplines including other earth sciences and life sciences.

The word paleontology or palaeontology is a compound word formed from the roots "paleo-", "onto-" and "-logy", equivalent to the French word paléontologie or the German word Paläontologie. The spelling paleontology is primarily used in North America, while the spelling palaeontology is preferred in the United Kingdom and was historically spelled as palæontology. Multiple different pronunciations can be found, including /ˌpeɪliɒnˈtɒlədʒi/ (pay-lee-uhn-TOL-uh-jee), /ˌpæliənˈtɒlədʒi/ (pal-ee-uhn-TOL-uh-jee), and /ˌpeɪliənˈtɑːlədʒi/ (pay-lee-uhn-TAH-luh-jee). The root word "paleo-" is from the classical Latin or scientific Latin palaeo- and its predecessor Ancient Greek παλαιο- meaning "ancient" or "old", the root noun "onto-" is from the Ancient Greek ὀντ- meaning a sense of relatedness, and the root word "-logy" is from the French ‑logie which derives from the classical Latin ‑logia and the Ancient Greek ‑λογία and in context means a field of study.

== Foundation ==
Paleontology includes the study of extinct animals and plants, including both direct observations about their remains and inferences about their behavior and how they interacted with their environment. From the recognition that fossils represented the remains of extinct organisms, paleontology became the zoology, botany, and biology of extinct organisms and therefore an important source for comparative anatomy. It was not always understood that paleontology is an evolutionary science, but over time, instances of evolution were recognized in the fossil record, and the two concepts have been closely linked ever since. The long span of geological time preserved in the fossil record allows very slow evolutionary changes to be observed, and the discovery of extinct organisms has allowed scientists to fill in gaps in the tree of life that cannot be understood through the study of extant organisms. The incorporation of a wider range of life sciences has allowed sub-disciplines like paleobiology and others to emerge.

=== Fossils ===
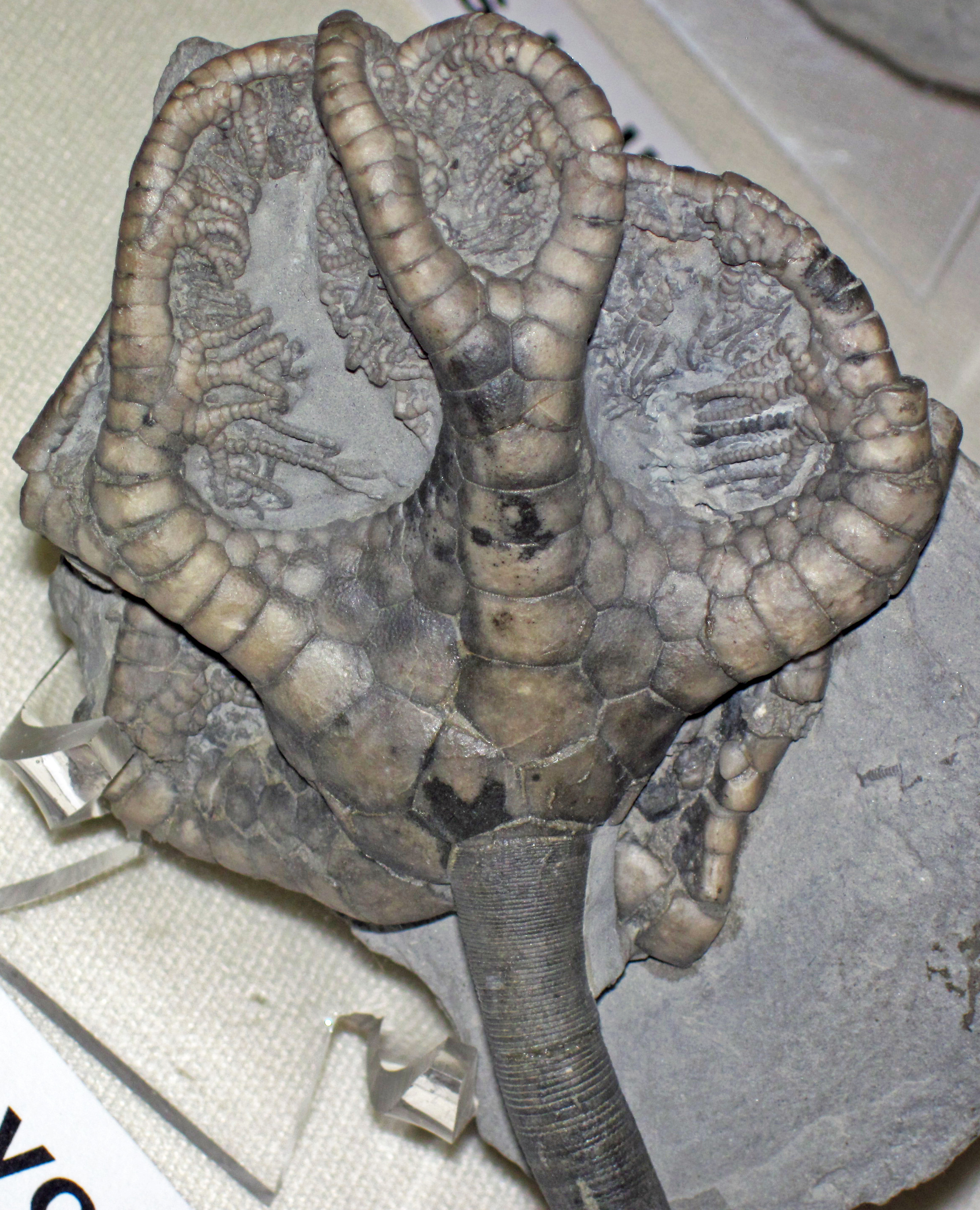
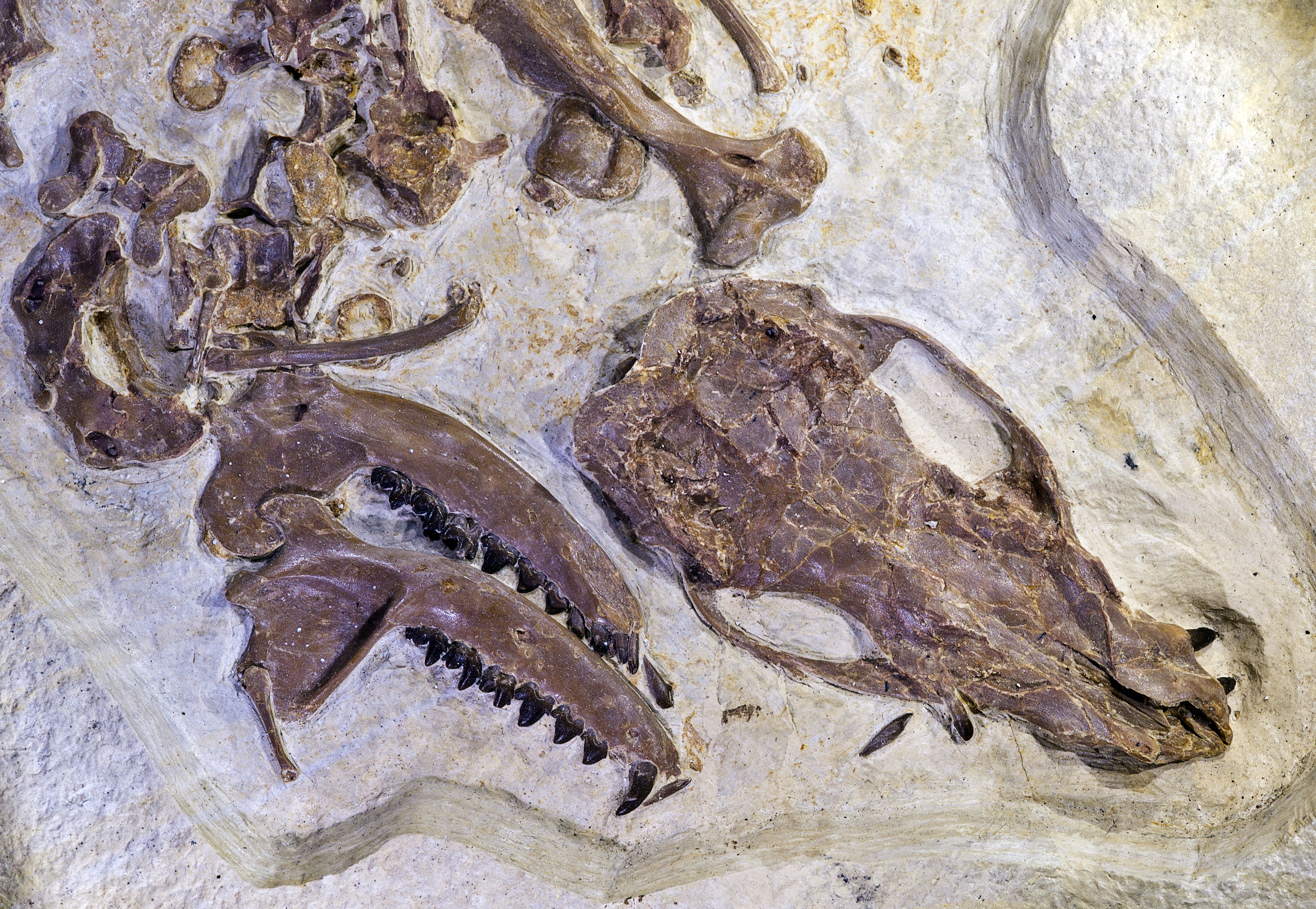
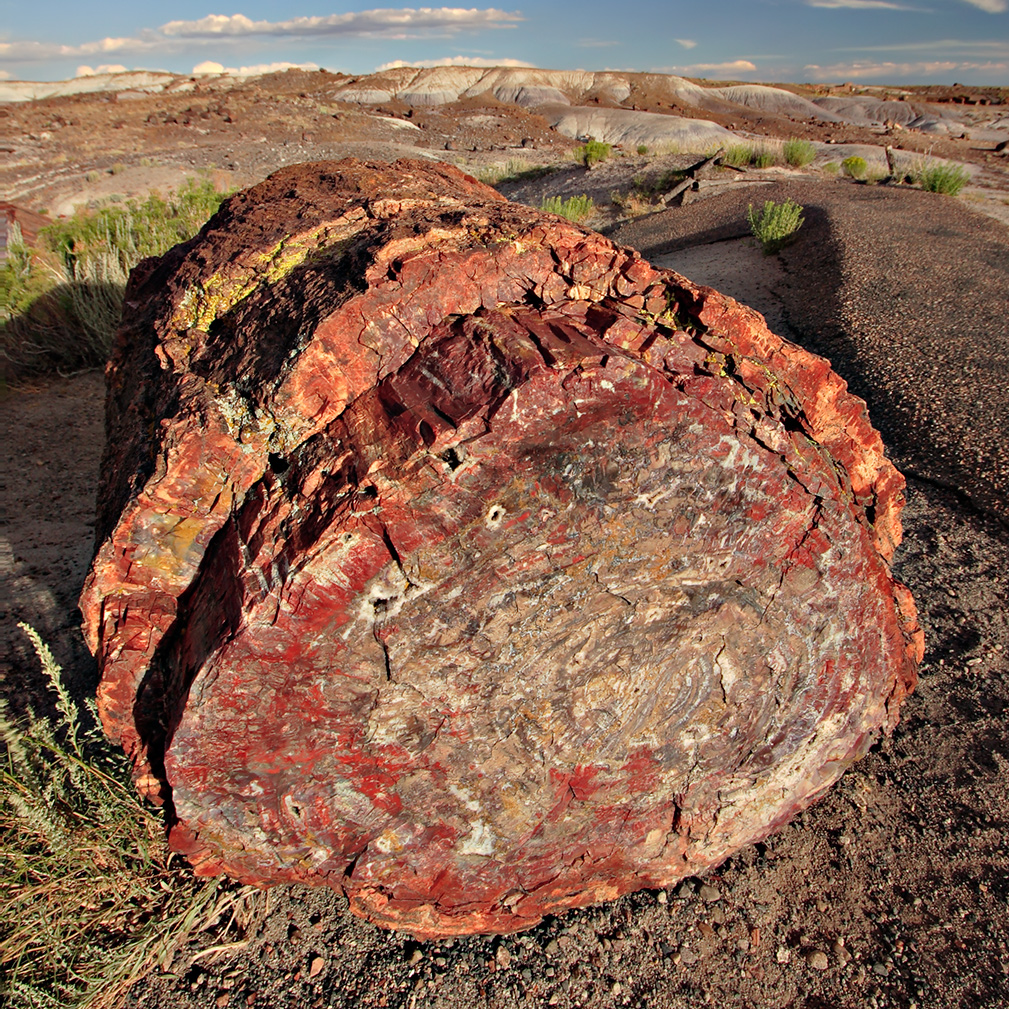
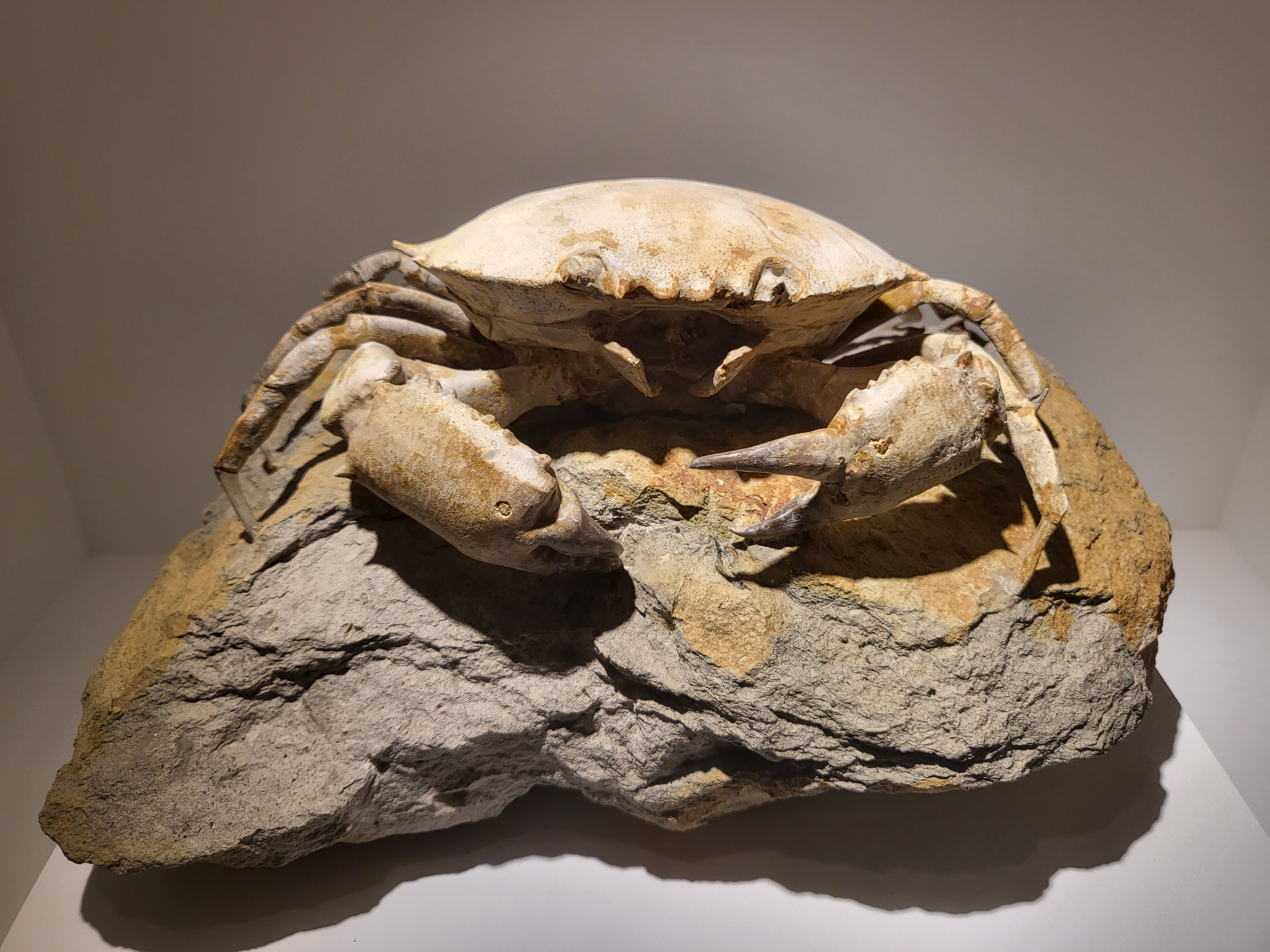
Collection of fossils (clockwise from top left): Onychocrinus, Palaeosinopa, Harpactocarcinus, petrified wood

Prior to the 19th century, the word "fossil" was used as a descriptive noun to characterize anything that had been dug out of the ground, including bones, stones, and gems. Early descriptions of what we now understand to be fossils described their appearances alongside and in the context of other minerals, crystals, and rocks. These early publications varied in contents of "fossils" across a wide spectrum of inorganic to organic appearances, including true fossils of differing preservation qualities, inorganic concretions, and structures with a resemblance to organisms. Over time the criteria for separating organic fossils from potentially organic or clearly inorganic materials brought about a change in the etymology of the word "fossil" itself, so accounts before the 19th century may not reflect the same use of the word fossil as modern paleontology. Both inorganic and organic fossils were illustrated in numerous books on the topic throughout the 16th century, with some attributing them to the work of God and other suggesting applications in construction or medicine. Fossils were not believed to have been organic, but instead to have exhibited the same kind of "growth" as crystals. Support for a possibly organic nature of fossils began in the 17th century, though it remained contentious as different quarries or strata yielded different fossils, which the scientists of the time did not have the context to explain. The fact that most fossils came from organisms that had never been observed alive anywhere in the world seemed to imply that these organisms were extinct, which was contrary to the belief of a perfect divine creation. Another compounding factor was that fossils of apparently marine animals were found in parts of the world that were well above sea-level. Some suggested that these fossils had accumulated in horizontal layers under the sea and that subsequent tectonic activity had displaced them from their original positions. As these observations were made over time, it was eventually understood that fossils could be used to make inferences about the history of life from their presence or absence in particular areas over time.

The fossil record is the main tool used by scientists to study the history of life and assess the diversification of life over time. Very little is known about the origins of life and the oldest life forms, and this is likely a result of the poor quality of fossil preservation in older rocks. Older rocks preserve less information on average than those deposited closer to the present, and this effect is compounded across the billions of years that life is believed to have existed. Most fossils are made up of the hard parts of an organism that have been recrystallized by minerals, preserving bone, wood, or shells in a material than can be harder or denser than in life. While the hard parts are the most likely to fossilize, soft tissues can also leave impressions on sediment before they fully decompose, allowing non-mineralized parts of an organism's anatomy to be preserved. Even more rarely, a complete organism can be encased in sediment before decomposition, preserving it completely. While most fossils are body fossils (made of the actual body parts of a dead organism), some fossils can also consist of traces of the behavior or life of organisms. This can include preserved burrows, footprints or coprolites, which are grouped together and called trace fossils. However, only a small minority of all dead organisms will ever become fossils. Some things can destroy organisms before or even after fossilization, including scavengers, decomposers, or natural disasters, and fossils can even be destroyed after they are formed by taphonomic processes. Even if a fossil survives burial, it can still be destroyed by weathering if it is exposed and not collected. The habitat of an organism can also impact its chances of fossilization. Seafloors are more likely to fossilize than land, and rivers or lakes are more likely to fossilize than mountains or deserts. Fossilized teeth are very common, but are not always collected when they are found, and more complete fossils may be more likely to be collected, but they are generally rarer in absolute terms. Even after collection, fossils may not be studied for a long time. They may remain in museum storage in crates, be on display, or be otherwise unaccessible to scientists.

=== Geologic time ===
The geologic time scale, proportionally represented as a log-spiral with some major events in Earth's history. A megaannus (Ma) represents one million (10^{6}) years.

The earliest discussions in the field of geology centered around the possible origins of geological features and what implications these had on Christianity. The concept of a history of Earth had existed for a long time, and those who studies rocks or fossils had come to the idea of changes over time. However, in the beginning of the field of geology in the early 19th century, the most common explanation for causes of geological change were that they were the result of sedimentation during the Biblical Flood, rather than slow processes drawn out over millions of years. French naturalist Georges Cuvier and his contemporaries believed that the Earth was not recently created (as in Young Earth Creationism), nor had it been around forever. They instead believed that there was a vast "prehuman" or antediluvian history. Cuvier was not the first to believe in a lengthy but finite age of the Earth, but he was the first to combine this idea with his study of fossils to suggest prehistoric events could be understood through the study of geology and the fossil record. Studies on rocks and their stratigraphy continued, including the development of geological maps highlighting the relative ages of regional geologic formations, and it was still believed that the Biblical Flood was a primary explanation for the formation of these features.

English geologist Charles Lyell was among the first to propose that a great flood had not occurred, and this was supported by the existence of overlapping terrestrial and marine sediment layers. He observed that the twisting, uplifting and carving of geological features supported the idea that the crust was moving continuously, and the sea level was also adjusting over time. This interpretation was not only supported by the differing levels of marine strata, but also by the shared commonality of fossils he found within them, even across large distances and at different levels above the sea. Combining these facts with his own previous work led Lyell to suggest some core principles of the history of the Earth. He suggested that there were progressive trends in the history of life, that geological history was continuously changing with periods of calm and chaos, and that the causes of these geological events were as much around in present day as in the deep past.

Following the ongoing study of geology, geologic formations, and the establishment of geochronology, the geologic time scale was created to separate and categorize the vast history of Earth into a scale of named geochronologic units, defined and standardized by the International Commission on Stratigraphy. The age and duration of different units has changed over time following further restudy including absolute and relative dating of different sediments, with the current standard recognizing four eons, ten eras, 22 periods, 37 epochs and 96 ages. Present day is recognized as the Meghalayan age, of the Holocene epoch, of the Quaternary period, of the Cenozoic era, of the Phanerozoic eon. These geological time units are correlated globally through combinations of assigned times, index fossils, paleomagnetism, and other methods, with the correlation of taxa with time being termed biochronology. Through biochronology, paleontological events such as the evolution, extinction, or speciation of a taxon can be established at a point in time, and features such as mass extinctions can be identified.

=== Extinction ===
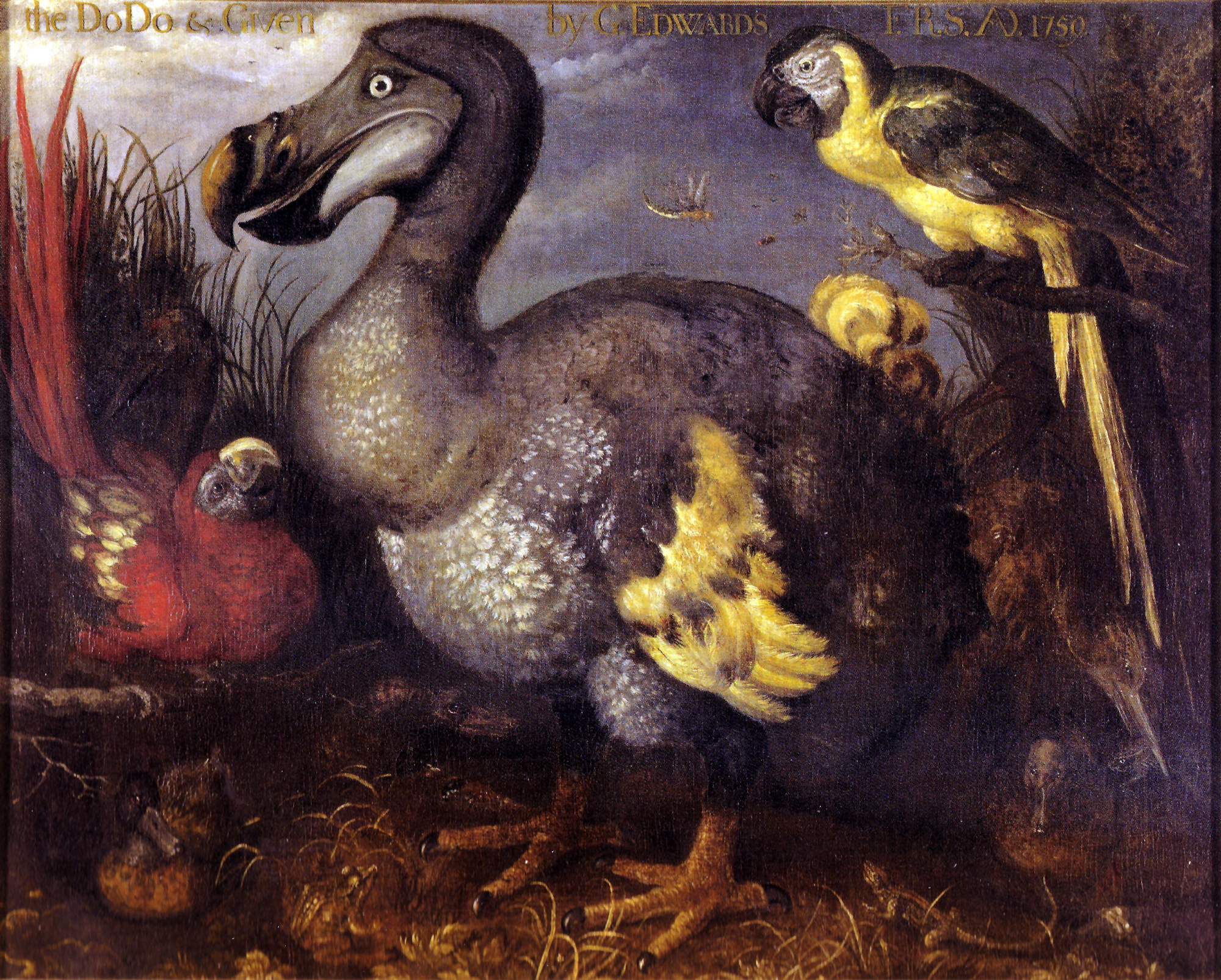
The Dodo of Mauritius which has gone extinct in modern times

Fossils have been documented from at least as far back as Ancient Greece. However, the belief of philosophers including Plato and Aristotle was that anything that existed had existed forever and would exist forever, or was along a continuum of perfection without any gaps. As a result of this fundamental belief, evidence of extinction was ignored or explained away by naturalists for most of recorded history. It was not until the work of Cuvier with the publication of his Recherches sur les ossemens fossiles (or Investigations on fossil bones), that extinction was understood and considered the principal basis for paleontology as a science. By the early-mid 19th century, it was no longer controversial that fossil animals existed in a sequential order and as a result that fauna and flora were changing over time. Cuvier himself denied that there was any direct continuity from any of these fossils to organisms alive in the present day, and thus that all were extinct. However, he also did not believe the idea that any presently extant organisms had been alive in the past. Instead he believed that over time great "revolutions" occurred in which all living organisms went extinct, and new ones arose, which was consistent with belief in the Biblical Flood. It was not until English naturalist Charles Darwin suggested that extinction and evolution both occurred together, that a full explanation could be given for changes of life over time. The fossil record showed that there was not a predetermined length of time for which a particular organism (or group of organisms) existed, and it also gave evidence for periods where a large percentage of organisms went extinct at once, which could be the result of mass extinction events.

Extinction can be seen as the final step of evolutionary change for any species. While modern biologists assess rates of extinction can be through the presence or absence of species in nature, paleontologists are limited in their understanding of this by the inherent rarity of fossils and the incompleteness of the fossil record. These difficulties make it more challenging to infer what extinction rates were in the past, and can make it difficult to differentiate between a true extinction and a "pseudoextinction", where one species evolves directly into another. Extinction of a species can occur from a variety of causes, and the intensity of extinction rates vary significantly over time. At least five mass extinction events are recognized to have occurred during the history of Earth, and it is also possible that the Earth is currently undergoing a sixth extinction as a result of human activity. However, mass extinction events only account for a small percentage of total species extinctions. Most extinctions occur as a result of other causes at differing times throughout Earth's history, which is sometimes called the background extinction rate. For most organisms in the fossil record, it is impossible to determine the cause of extinction in particular or even general cases.

=== Evolution ===
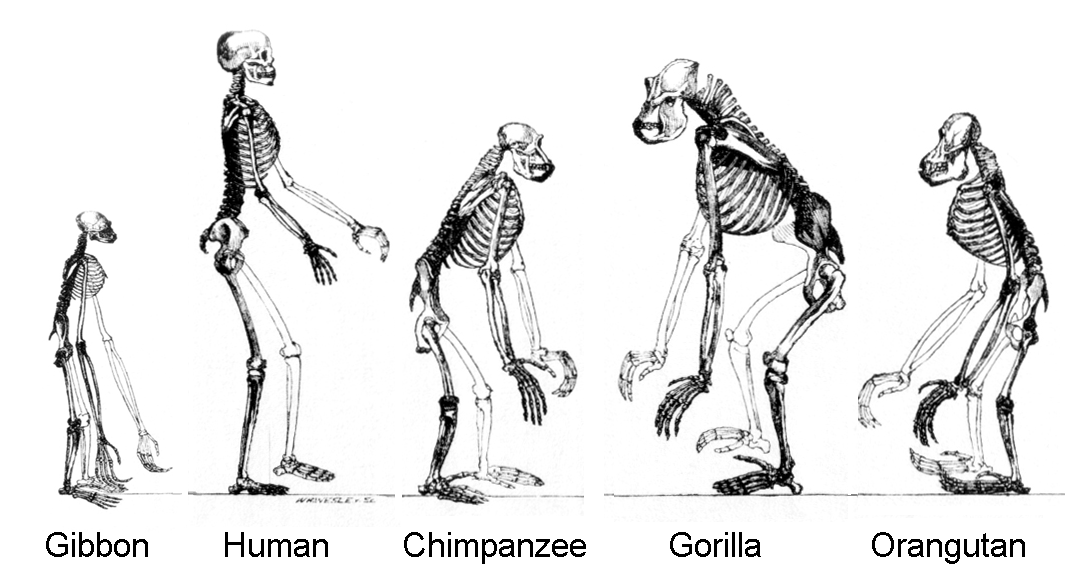
The skeletons of hominoids, evolutionary descendants of a common ancestor

For most of human history, philosophers, theologians, and other intellectuals believed that the world was perfectly ordered by divine forces and could not have come about from natural processes. There are exceptions such as the Greek philosopher Empedocles who thought that fossils may have come from organic life that had undergone change, but this was the exception. Most religious doctrines, including Christianity and Judaism, taught that the world was created by God as it currently exists, so life could not have progressed and the natural world was instead the product of intelligent design. The evolutionary significance of the fossil record was not initially recognized because individual fossils only show snapshots of evolutionary history. However, recognition of the ability for traits to be passed to later generations was used by French naturalist Jean-Baptiste Lamarck in the 19th century to argue for evolution. Early proponents of evolution initially believed that God had set the world in motion but let it progress naturally, while critics such as Cuvier thought that intermediate forms required would have been unable to survive and so rejected the possibility of evolution outright. Influenced by the writings of Lyell, Charles Darwin studied similarities in organisms during his time aboard HMS Beagle which would eventually become the book On the Origin of Species. In it, Darwin proposed the concept of natural selection which would become fundamental to the later theory of evolution. Darwin also suggested that gaps in the fossil record were the result of incomplete fossilization and that transitional fossils would eventually be found that would corroborate the theory of evolution.

Paleontologists cannot use the species concepts of modern biology due to limitations of working on fossils rather than living organisms. However, differences in the morphology of organisms based on their fossil remains can be used to separate phenotypes. Once phenotypic differences in a population of organisms accumulate, they should become genetically isolated and thus separate species. Therefore, the phenotypes observed in fossils can be used as a proxy to infer differences between species throughout deep time. It is possible that these evolutionary and morphological changes occurred slowly and gradually as is hypothesized by phyletic gradualism, or that short bursts of rapid evolution occurred in punctuated equilibrium. Evidence for both methods of macroevolution are present in the fossil record, and the discovery of new fossils continuously helps to fill gaps in our understanding of the evolutionary history of life.

== History ==
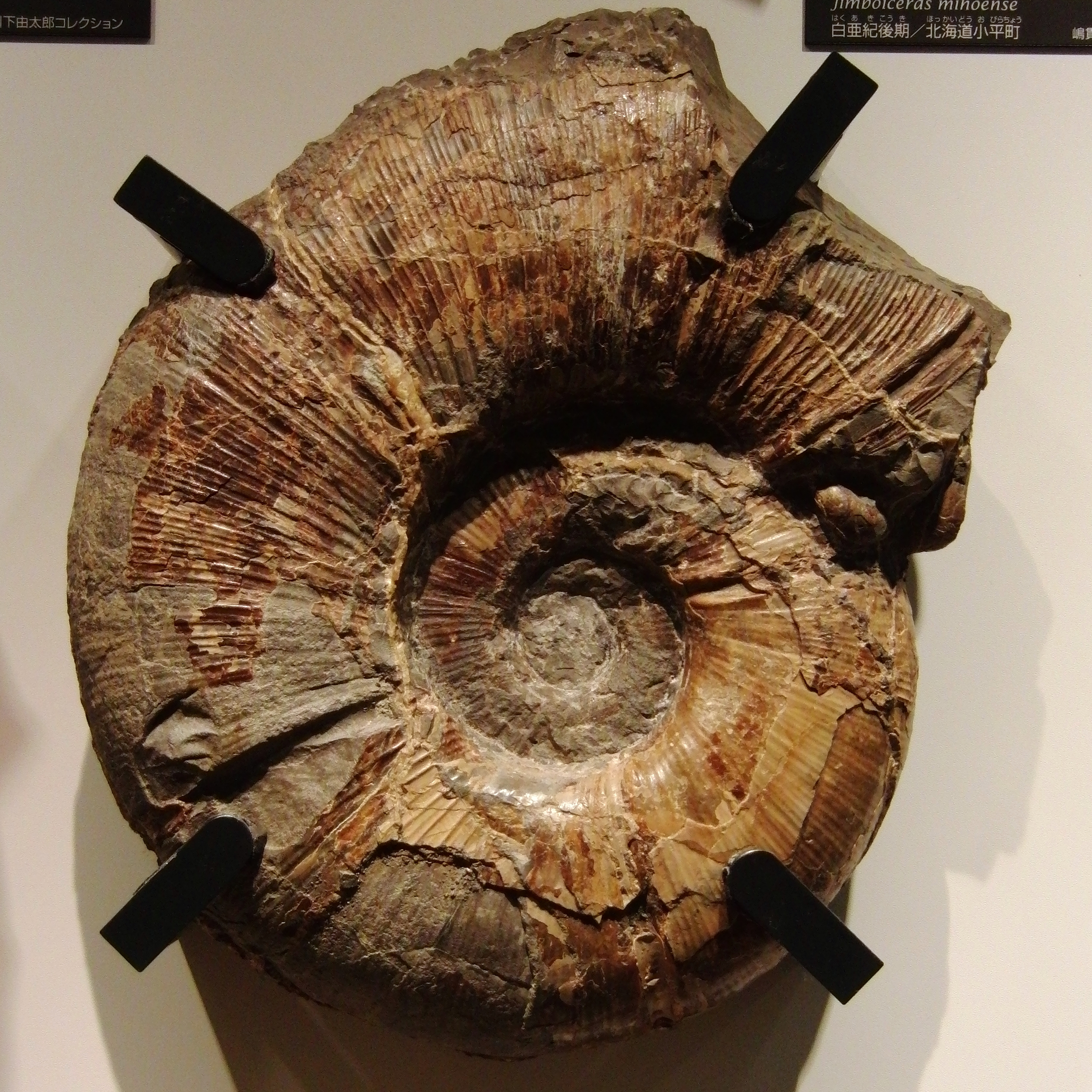
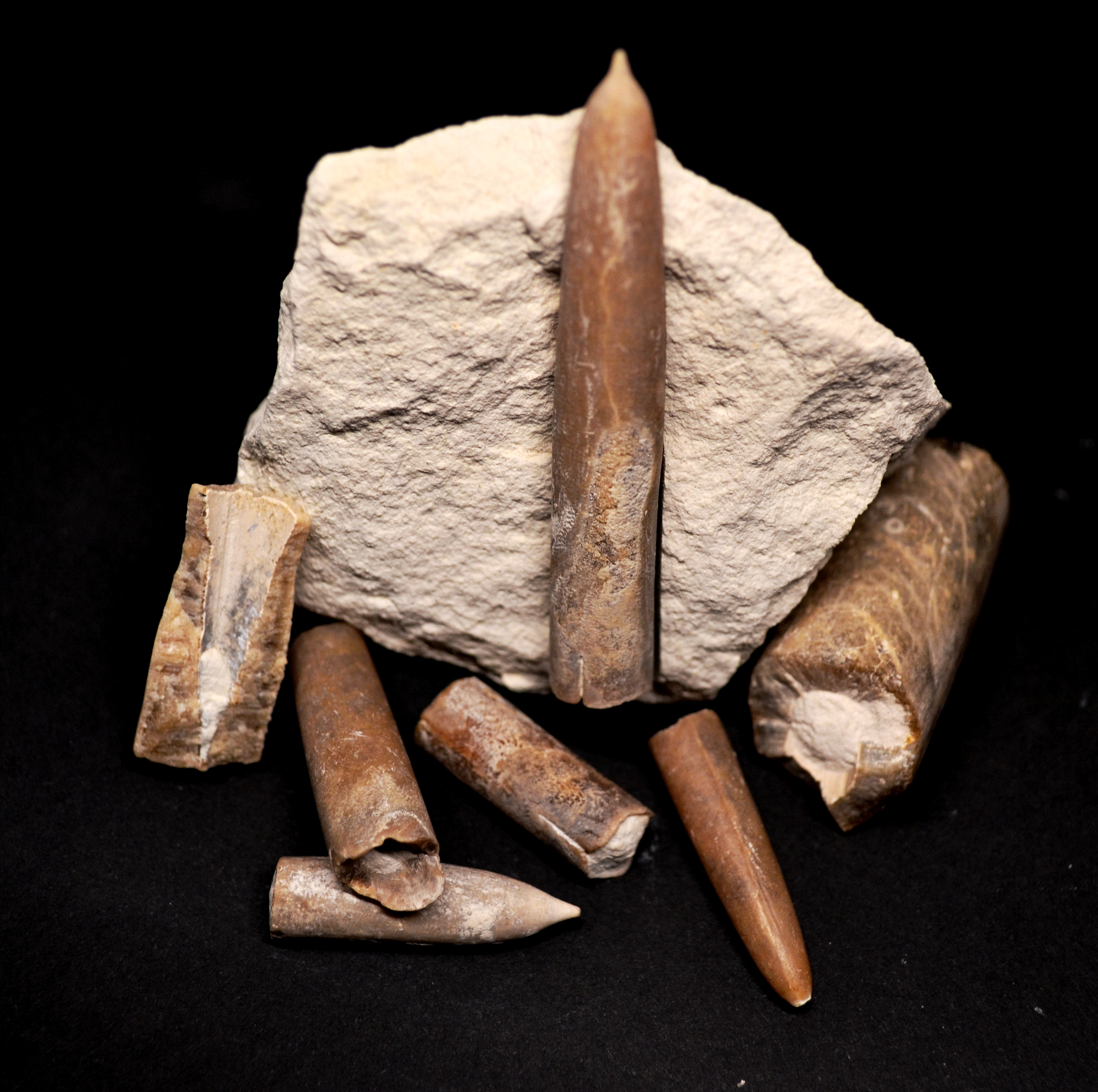
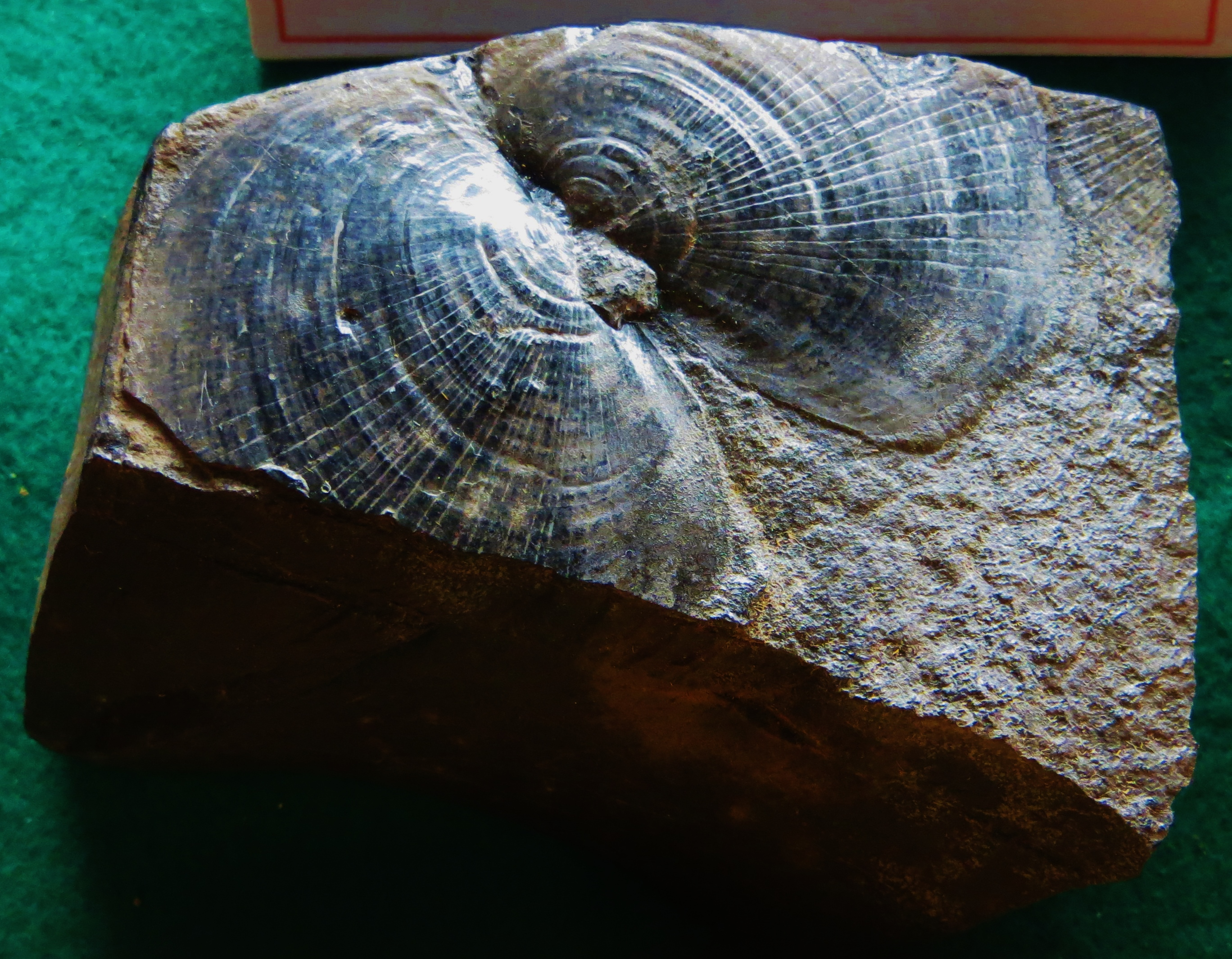
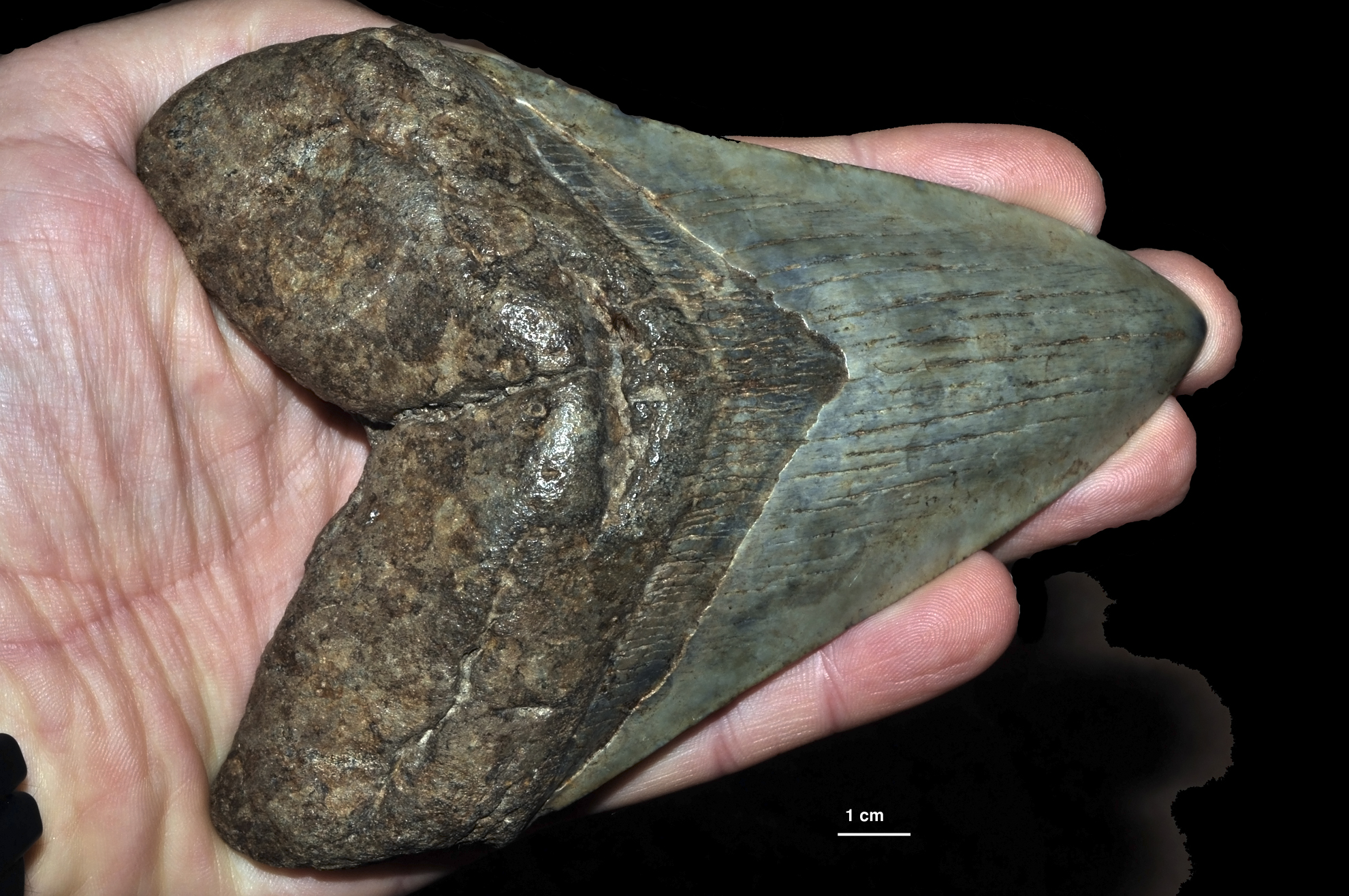
Fossil shells debated to be organic or inorganic in origin (clockwise from top left): ammonites, belemnites, shark teeth, and bivalves

Cuvier is generally regarded as the first paleontologist, and the origins of paleontology as a science trace their origins directly to his demonstrations that fossils in stone were traces of organisms that were once alive but had gone extinct. Despite this, he was far from the first to write about fossils or make observations about things found in rock. Isolated comments from writers about fossils can be found going back to classical antiquity. The philosopher Xenophanes (6th century BCE) believed fossil shells represented life from the past, whereas Aristotle instead explained fossils as "vaporous exhalations". Aristotle's belief was later refined into the theory of a petrifying liquid by Arabic philosopher Avicenna and German philosopher Albert of Saxony in the middle ages. Chinese naturalist Shen Kuo also proposed a theory of climate change around this time based on the presence of petrified bamboo in regions that in his time were too dry for bamboo. In unpublished notebooks, the Italian polymath Leonardo da Vinci justified an organic origin for the fossil shells available to him. His notes show observations of living mollusks and their ecology, the processes of sedimentation, and the recognition that the fossil shells had similar features, showed similar growth stages, and had similar pathologies to living mollusks. Da Vinci's study of sedimentation meant he understood why fossils were usually embedded in rocks, and his notes demonstrate a very modern interpretation of the origin of fossils. He rejected the Aristotelian theory of vapors and also did not believe that the Biblical Flood was the primary cause of fossil formation. Da Vinci's notebooks may have inspired others of the time to accept a biologic origin of fossils, but this belief was not accepted by everyone. In addition to his study of body fossils, da Vinci is also credited as the founder of the field of ichnology, which is primarily concerned with trace fossils and how they can provide insights into the behavior of extinct organisms.

In the 17th century, naturalists like the Danish scientist Nicolas Steno and the English polymath Robert Hooke provided further discussions on the origins of fossils. The general belief was that fossils were of organic origin, but that they had been fossilized by petrifying liquids and moved into elevation by the Biblical Flood or some other means. Conversely, the English physician Martin Lister completely rejected the possibility of organic fossil origins. The fossils available to Steno, da Vinci, and others mentioned above were primarily the easily-identifiable shells of marine animals, and their organic origin was a relatively straightforward inference. The fossils in England were from rocks dating to the Jurassic or Carboniferous and came from a variety of different organisms that bore no clear resemblance to modern organisms. Many explanations were suggested for the possible inorganic or organic origins of fossils, how they came to be lithified, and how they ended up far above the sea, but the ideas of extinction and deep time had not yet been developed, so an explanation eluded naturalists of the time.

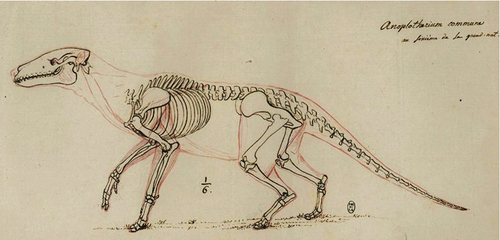
Cuvier's 1812 unpublished illustration of the extinct mammal Anoplotherium

A significant moment in the history of paleontology was the publication of the 1796 paper On the species of living and fossil elephants by Georges Cuvier, which contained detailed evidence for extinction. Cuvier named the fossil taxon Megatherium, based on bones found in Paraguay. The large size of these bones made it unlikely that they were from an extant, but undiscovered, animal. Cuvier reached a similar conclusion regarding the fossils named the mastodon, with the uniqueness of these animals demonstrating that they belonged to species that were no longer alive and thus extinct. To further justify this conclusion, Cuvier extensively studied the fossils of elephants and proved the distinction of mammoths from Siberia and Europe from their living relatives. Presenting this work on the extinction of the megafauna, Cuvier termed the events that led to their disappearance "revolutions", contrasting with the idea of gradual change in the environment and the fauna within it. Of the three possibilities leading to the disappearance, Cuvier supported extinction over migration as well as over evolution as suggested by Lamarck, with his view that extinction and evolution were conflicting explanations. Cuvier also studied the comparative anatomy of both living and fossil organisms and developed a way to assess their morphological characters, which opened the door for developing an understanding of the animals of the past.

Developments in the fields of stratigraphy and paleontology following the work of Cuvier became widespread throughout Europe, and the classification of extinct organisms into different groups that included their living relatives also proliferated. While most of Cuvier's early studies had been on mammals, there were some fossils with no close living analogues such as the bird-like fossil reptile he called the Ptero-dactyle or the fish-like marine reptiles that were eventually named ichthyosaurs. It was in 1822 that Henri Marie Ducrotay de Blainville, a former student of Cuvier, introduced the name paléontologie for the study of these ancient beings. He had earlier introduced the names paléozoologie and paléosomiologie for the studies of fossil animals and fossils in general, respectively, but the latter did not see widespread use and paleontology was the name generally adopted for the field by naturalists of the time. Some of the most significant discoveries of this early time in paleontology were made by Mary Anning and her family, who uncovered skeletons from a variety of marine reptiles and other animals in the Lyme Regis region including Ichthyosaurus and Plesiosaurus. These animals were geologically older than the mammals of Cuvier's earlier work, and this relative age became the study of stratigraphy which enabled scientists to date and order animals relative to one another in geologic time. The works of Cuvier and Lamarck on extinction and the history of life, and the works of Lyell and English geologist Adam Sedgwick on geology, were all synthesized by Charles Darwin in his seminal works on the theory of evolution. He suggested that the history of life was full of gradual changes, with the constant presence of extinction acting as the driver evolution through natural selection. This was validated by multiple discoveries soon after Darwin began publishing. The discovery of the theropods Compsognathus and Archaeopteryx demonstrated evidence for the progressive evolution of birds from other reptiles, which shifted paleontological study in the direction of studying the evolution of life.

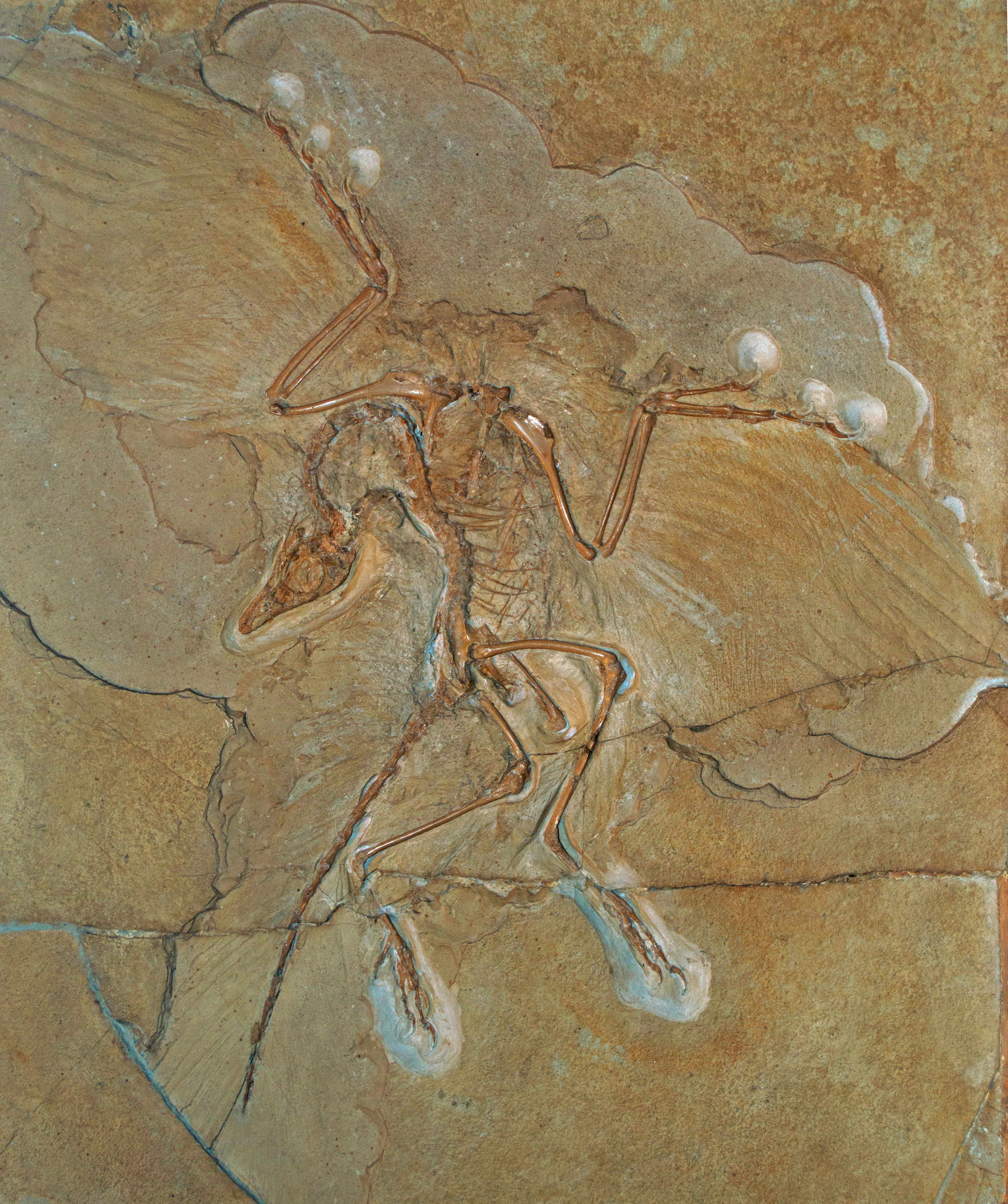
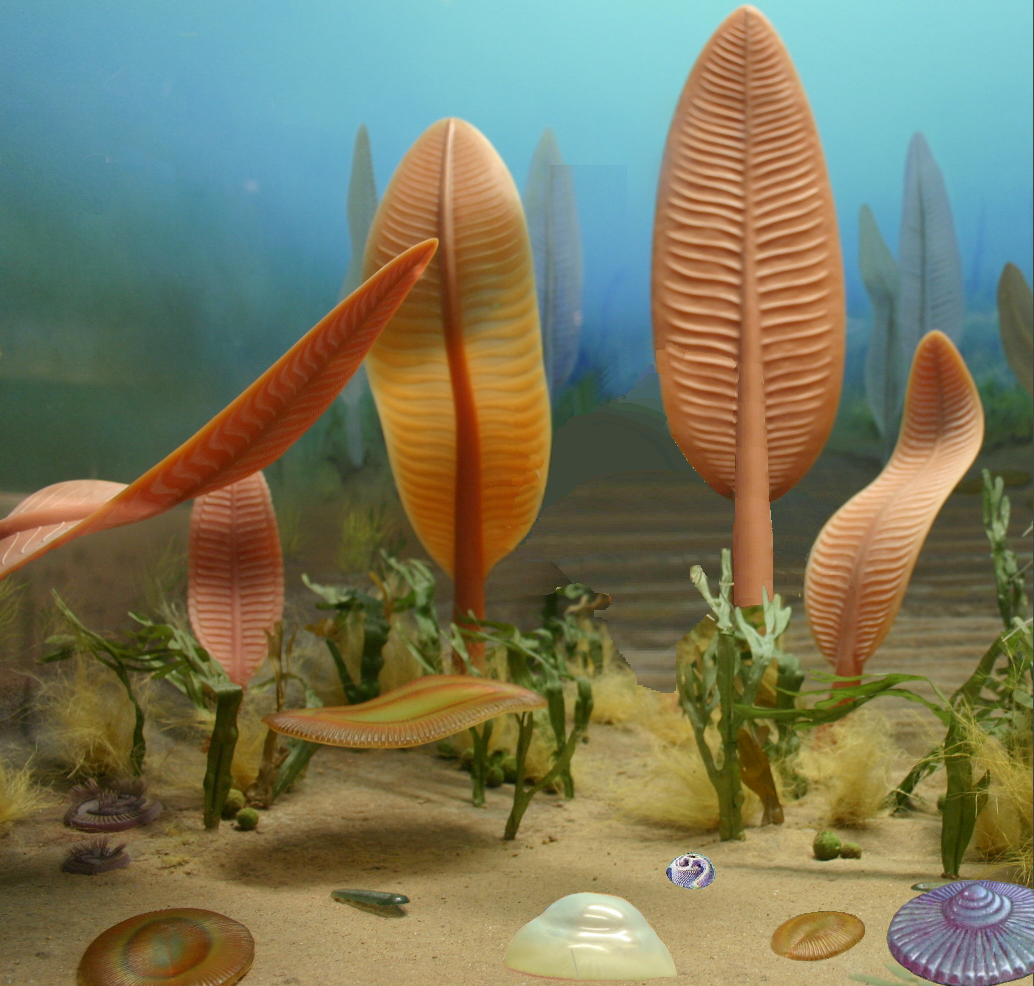
Skeleton of Archaeopteryx (left) and display of the sea of the Ediacaran biota (right)

For a time paleontology was considered a sub-discipline of geology with relatively little study given to the biological aspects of the field, and paleontology was generally not treated as an important field of study of either science. Over the subsequent decades, geology and biology advanced to theory-based analysis while paleontology lagged behind as a field focused primarily on stratigraphy. This changed with the development of paleobiology in the second half of the 20th century. This shift was driven by conceptual changes in the study of evolution and phylogenetics and the emergence of new ways to study geology through biostratigraphy, paleobiogeography, taphonomy and paleoclimatology. Phylogenetics were developed as a way to quantitatively analyze and interpret the evolution and relationships of organisms, providing context and predictability for evolutionary processes and the impacts of mass extinctions and their recoveries. Paleoecology itself has seen the emergence of subdisciplines including the field of taphonomy to study the nature of the fossil record. Emphasis was also given to the analysis of diversity and the distribution of taxa, the study of trace fossils, the understanding of paleoenvironments, and conservation paleobiology. Advancements in technology and the analytical tools of other sciences have also been integrated into paleontology including geochemical analysis, molecular biology, and other computer-aided visualization or analysis techniques.

The beginning of modern paleontology was arguably in the Victorian era, with little substantial change in practices in the field since. However, paleontology has increasingly broadened to include a wider variety of scientific questions. For example, the sizes of the largest dinosaurs, pterosaurs, or arthropods pose questions to study in the fields of biomechanics, ontogeny, and physiology. Diversification and mass extinction can be predicted and better understood from the study of phylogenetics, and as technologies and precision improve, the depth to which we understand life of the past will increase.

== Applications ==
Life timeline
← / Earth formed; ← / Earliest water; ← / LUCA; ← / Earliest fossils; ← / Great Oxygenation Event; ← / Sexual reproduction; ← / Earliest fungi; ← / Neoproterozoic oxygenation event; ← / Ediacaran biota; ← / Cambrian explosion; ← / Earliest tetrapods; ← / Earliest hominoid
(million years ago)

Paleontology both draws from and contributes to the fields of geology and biology, despite historically being dismissed as an undemanding science. Analysis and description of fossils allows the researchers to illustrate biological, geological, ecological and tectonic changes and phenomena which have implications for our understanding of science in the present. Many disciplines and areas of study interact with paleontology and overlap in some areas with the field. Through this overlap, paleontology has the ability to better our understanding of the origin, diversity and evolution of life, and can be used by other fields to investigate patterns in the fossil record. In the modern day, paleontology is viewed as important by researchers. Its study enables scientists to understand the history of life. It can explain different worlds of the past and the impact of a changing climate and biodiversity, and paleontology helps expand our understanding of both evolution and extinction. Subfields of paleontology also enable geologists to robustly establish the ages of various rock formations.

=== History of life ===
Paleontological discoveries have discussed the origins and history of life for centuries, with very little knowledge of life before the Cambrian for a significant amount of time. Fossils from prior to the Cambrian were limited to 2.1 billion year old fossilized algae and possibly "plants" until the discoveries of fauna in the Bitter Springs Group and Apex chert of Australia, the Mistaken Point Formation of Canada, and the Doushantuo Formation of China, all of which have significantly expanded knowledge of the Ediacaran biota that includes a range of life from microscopic single-celled organisms to macroscopic multicellular life. Fossil discoveries have also improved knowledge about the Cambrian explosion with the discoveries of multiple new lagerstätte deposits. The Burgess Shale was one of the first such deposits and has been further explored, and around 40 other Burgess-type localities are now known globally. These localities are filled with soft-bodied taxa that show the decline of the Ediacaran biota and the emergence of other kinds of metazoan life. The refinement of Cambrian stratigraphy will also improve the understanding of these early faunas and how they changed over time.

Through advances in paleontology many other evolutionary paths have become better understood even in more recent life. The evolution of birds is now understood to have occurred from gradual evolutionary changes in saurischian dinosaurs up to the point where it is difficult to draw a line between what dinosaurs are or are not birds. The origins of dinosaurs themselves are better understood from the discoveries of multiple near-dinosaur taxa. Discoveries within the Eocene of fossil mammals have allowed for the evolution of whales to be nearly completely understood, with the fully terrestrial mesonychids becoming gradually amphibious before becoming aquatic swimmers. Relatives of modern whales such as Basilosaurus were obligate swimmers, but even then had not developed the bauplan of modern cetaceans that occurred over further gradual evolution. The evolution of reptile groups such as ichthyosaurs and turtles, while still controversial, is much better understood with finds such as the early incompletely-shelled turtle Proganochelys.

Human evolution is also much better understood from progress in paleontology, including both the evolution of hominids from basal primates as well as the speciation and origins of humans within the hominids. Fossils of Australopithecus and Ardipithecus show that humans never transitioned through an ape-like stage, instead being bipedal with adaptations for arboreal locomotion. Ardipithecus is known from lowland forest environments, and not grasslands, suggesting the origins of humanity within a variable and unpredictable habitat. The evolution of humans within the genus Homo is similarly complex and does not follow a clean linear path as sometimes described. Some species of Homo may have overlapped in time and place with others, but all show that the evolution of the genus was likely in Africa. Advancements and new discoveries have also shown that the neanderthals were a complex society with the use of tools, clothes, and having their own mythology. DNA from neanderthals and humans show substantial differences, but also that there was interbreeding between populations.

=== Extinction events ===
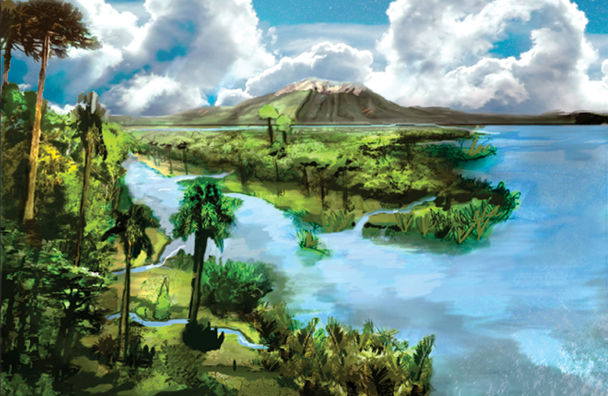
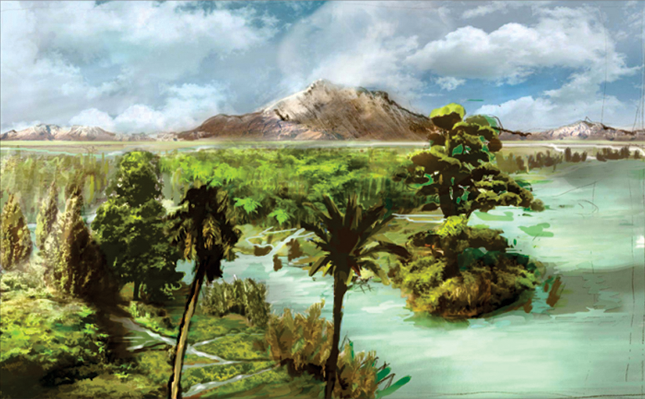
Illustrations of the main floral ecosystem before (left) and after (right) the K-Pg extinction

The idea of a mass extinction has been around since the beginning of paleontology and is generally accepted as true events that drive the evolution of life. However, the question of what makes an extinction event a "mass extinction" is still uncertain. On the scale of geologic time, mass extinction events happen rapidly, and such rapid events can be caused by both gradual environmental processes and large-scale catastrophes. A notable exception to this rule is the Cretaceous-Paleogene extinction event, which is believed to have been caused by an asteroid impact which caused global wildfires and a disruption of the nutrient cycle in the ocean. If this is the case, it would be an unprecedentedly rapid extinction event, occurring over the course of one or a few years. However, even this extinction's cause is debated. Some have suggested that it was caused by marine regression or volcanism that occurred near or at the same time as an impact. No other extinction events can be linked clearly with an extraterrestrial cause. Glaciation and subsequent global warming has been suggested as a cause for the Late Ordovician mass extinction, and the volcanic activity of the Siberian Traps large igneous province has been suggested as the primary cause for the Permian-Triassic mass extinction. The causes of the Late Devonian mass extinction and the Triassic-Jurassic mass extinction remain mostly uncertain to this day.

The period of ecological recovery following a mass extinction is also a significant time for biodiversity and adaptive radiation. The term "disaster species" has been applied to the organisms that follow an ecological disruption, and there are many known from the fossil record. Following the Cretaceous-Paleogene extinction, there is a large spike in the abundance of fossil ferns that is interpreted as an early post-extinction flora that would later be overtaken by different floral communities. There is a similarly rapid diversification of small, generalist mammals for the first 3 million years before more diverse faunal communities evolved. However, not all mass extinctions have similarly rapid diversification events. The recovery period following the Permian-Triassic extinction took up to 10 million years. The recovery of ecosystems from mass extinctions involves the evolution of novel ecological relationships between groups of animals that would not have been possible in the pre-extinction ecosystem.

=== Biostratigraphy ===
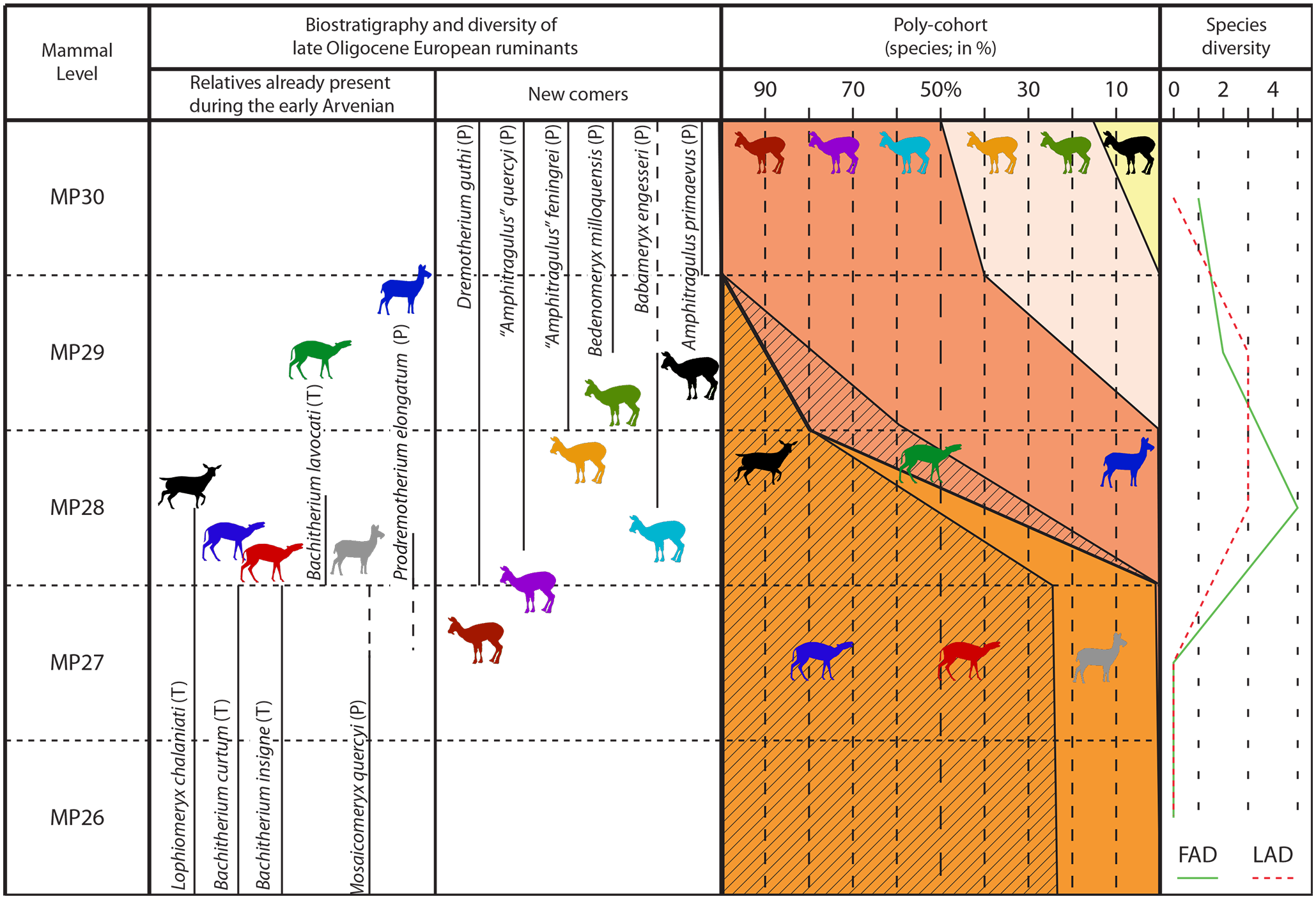
Biostratigraphy of ruminants from the Oligocene of western Europe

Fossils have been used for stratigraphic correlation since at least the 18th century. Observed changes in the fossils found through geologic time led to the principle of ecological succession, however this study was not elaborated on until the 1960s. The first and last appearance of a taxon in the fossil record can be used to compare the relative ages of different lithographic sections of sediment. This principle allows for relative ages of different sediments to be determined more precisely. These "index fossils" are combined with measurements of volcanic ash, paleomagnetic reversals, or pre-dated sediments to make precise measurements of geologic time. For example, the Jurassic Period was named and defined based on ten main subdivisions identified through the English and French assemblages of ammonites, some of which are still in use today. Biostratigraphy is also applied to the analysis of stratotype sections and boundaries of geologic time units. It can also use the first or last appearance date of a taxon to establish time periods that are independent of their constituent strata.

The geologic time scale is based primarily on the biostratigraphy (correlating strata) and equivalent biochronology (correlating times) of the appearance and disappearance of various fossil taxa. Some factors can introduce uncertainty into this process including the quality or quantity of sampled fossils. Different graphical and numerical methods are used in the construction of the geologic time scale. Even the Ediacaran, which is poorly represented through fossils, can be assessed using biostratigraphy in combination with chemostratigraphy and absolute dating. The biostratigraphy of the Ordovician and Silurian is based primarily on fossils of graptolites and conodonts. Other common groups used in zonation include ammonites, foraminifera, and plant pollen, where it is preserved.

=== Classification ===
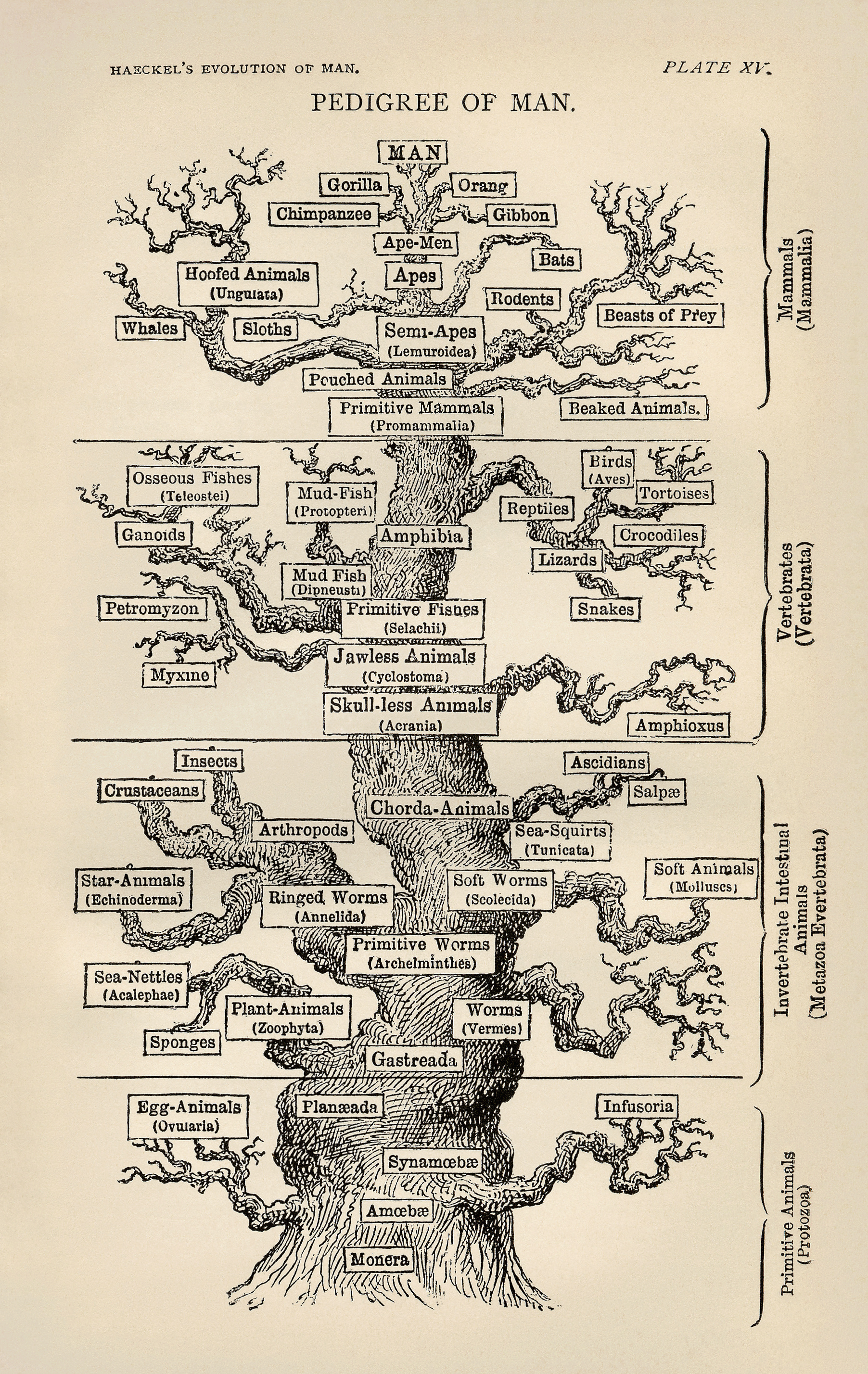
Ernst Haeckel's "tree of life", illustrating an early understanding of how evolution relates to classification

The foundation of modern taxonomy is the scheme of hierarchy adopted by Carl Linnaeus where taxa were grouped in taxonomic categories. While Linnaean hierarchy was not the first system, it formed the basis for subsequent systems, with seven principle categories arising to classify life: Kingdom, Phylum, Class, Order, Family, Genus, and Species (Division instead of Phylum for botany). Intermediate categories were also developed, though they were not considered mandatory to specify. Following On the Origin of Species in 1859, the concept of taxonomic hierarchy shifted to describe common descent through evolution rather than similarity, rendering some previously-accepted groups non-monophyletic as they excluded descendants. The continued trend of emphasizing evolutionary descent has led to a reduced significance of Linnaean taxonomy because of these inconsistencies.

An important development classification in modern paleontology was the adoption of phylogenetic systematics as a tool to study the evolutionary tree of life. The use of phylogenetics allows scientists to quantitatively describe the relatedness of organisms through reconstructions of evolutionary trees. Phylogenetic analysis was first applied to the fields of entomology and ichthyology, after extensive debates within those fields before being adopted by evolutionary biologists more broadly. By using systematics, scientists can test and retest hypotheses about evolutionary relationships, and the results are typically displayed as a cladogram. The widespread use of systematics coincided with the advent of molecular biology, which has allowed scientists to use genetic data in addition to morphological data to study evolutionary relationships. Classification systems in general have also shifted in favor of phylogenetics. The Linnean classification scheme with its well-defined taxonomic ranks has gradually fallen out of use, because it does not generally perform well as a reflection of true evolutionary relationships.

Further applications of classification to paleontology include more focused issues such as delineating the distinction between microevolution and macroevolution. Microevolutionary paleontology is the study of how evolutionary pressure impacts the ability of single individuals to survive over others, while macroevolutionary paleontology focuses on the ability of whole species to survive over others. Some scientists have suggested that microevolution and macroevolution are separate processes, with morphological changes originating from speciation rather than gradual anagenesis of a population. Others have argued that both individuals and populations are affected by natural selection.

== Subdisciplines ==
Paleontology overlaps and integrates with many other disciplines of science into fields that focus on more specific topics. The overlap of paleontology with biology, paleobiology, includes studies on macroevolution, extinction, speciation, diversification, morphology, biogeography, phylogeny, paleoecology, molecular paleontology, taphonomy, and evolutionary developmental biology. Many subdisciplines of paleontology are focused on specific groups of organisms: invertebrate paleontology is the study of fossil invertebrates; vertebrate paleontology is the study of fossil vertebrates; paleoalgology is the study of fossil algae; paleobotany is the study of fossil plants; paleoentomology is the study of fossil insects; paleoherpetology is the study of fossil reptiles and amphibians; paleoichthyology is the study of fossil fish; paleomalacology is the study of fossil mollusks; paleomammalogy is the study of fossil mammals; paleomycology is the study of fossil fungi; paleomyrmecology is the study of fossil ants; paleornithology is the study of fossil birds; paleoprimatology is the study of fossil primates; and paleozoology is the study of fossil animals. Paleontology in general also overlaps with studies on growth, paleoanthropology, many fields that focus on the Earth's climatic and geographic past, histology, ichnology, pathology and forensics, and taphonomy, forming the subdisciplines described below.

=== Paleoanthropology ===
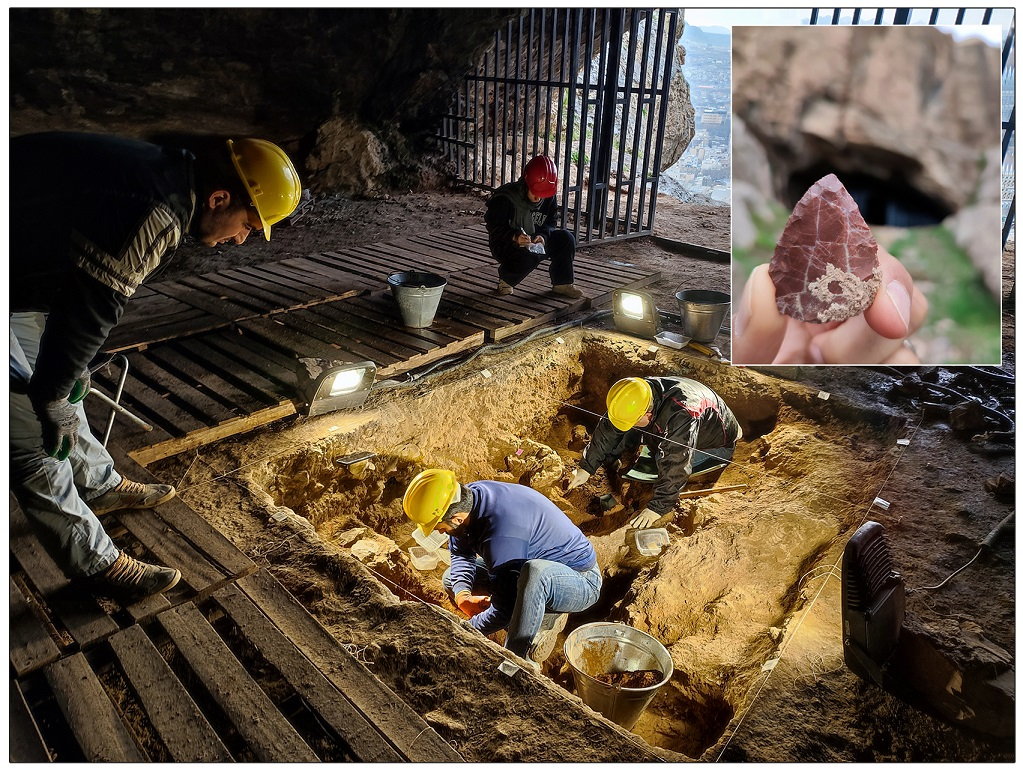
Archaeological excavations in the Middle Paleolithic cave site of the Ghamari Cave in Zagros Mountains

Paleoanthropology is a field of study that focuses on the evolutions of humans. The field can trace its origins to the works of German naturalist Johann Blumenbach in the late 18th century and then the discovery of a neanderthal in the mid 19th century though it only took its modern form as the study of human evolution following World War II with the acceptance of evolutionary biology. Paleoanthropology utilizes information on humans drawn from both fossils and archaeology to interpret the rise and spread of humans. Beliefs were that only a single species of hominid was present at any one time, forming a natural progression to modern humans, considering the diverse groups of species proposed as synonyms. Discoveries showed that this belief was not correct, with human evolution displaying a complex and uncertain arrangement of individuals, populations, and species with the advent of phylogenetic analyses. Ardipithecus is one of the oldest known of the human branch of hominids, having lived 4.4 million years ago and only found in 1994. Species of the genus Australopithecus from across Africa have been named since the 1970s and are slightly younger, but already show the bipedal stance of modern humans. From Australopithecus likely evolved both Homo and the more robust hominid Paranthropus, which is unlike modern humans in build but lived alongside early humans for some time.

It is known that early humans were capable of making and using tools from the discoveries of fossils of Homo habilis in places where stone tools had previously been found. The earliest known stone tools are from around 3.3 million years ago, and while they are often associated with Homo it is also possible that the coexisting species Australopithecus garhi was a toolmaker. There is reluctance to believe that an australopith was capable of making and using tools, but the origins of Homo are unclear and there is little that can be used to distinguish tool-making from non-tool-making hominids when fossils and tools are not found together. The first humans to show a more slender modern bauplan are those of Homo ergaster, which is sometimes considered part of African Homo erectus, from around 1.6 million years ago. Once the modern body form evolved, humans spread far beyond Africa, spreading across Eurasia from which evolved Homo heidelbergensis and Homo neanderthalensis. Though the diversity of neanderthals is uncertain, sites have been found that show they had a burial culture and a rich technological record. The similarities between Homo sapiens and these older or coexisting species makes it difficult to determine what made modern humans unique.

=== Paleobiogeography ===
Biogeographic distribution of fossils in Pangaea

Paleobiogeography is a very similar field to biogeography but focuses instead on fossils rather than modern organisms. Both fields work to explain the differences in flora and fauna between different locations, rather than the expectation that regions of similar climate and habitat would house the same organisms. Biogeography relies on exploration, both as an exploratory tool to understand the world, but also the physical act of travelling to different places to observe differences. Paleobiogeography is named with the prefix "paleo" to differentiate in its use of the fossil record to study biogeography, which means that paleobiogeography suffers from the same issues as other paleontological fields regarding the limitations of the fossil record. It was established as a geoscience from the recognition and acceptance of the theory of continental drift that was hinted at by the discoveries of similar fossils on now-distance continents during the 19th century. Paleobiogeography involves studying the history of life, but is relevant for the study of evolutionary, geological, and ecological changes as external factors such as biogeography are one of the two drivers of evolution. Ecological processes can be studied that cause speciation or regulate diversity, and these differences across location can be tied to geological processes like plate tectonics and climate change. Modern biogeography has the advantage of being able to study molecular markers and more thoroughly study small spatial and temporal regions creating a better picture of a specific environment. Paleobiogeography on the other hand is capable of studying very long timescales, able to track history beyond just the modern era. Flora and fauna may be affected by small-scale cycles as well as broader effects that cannot be seen on a limited timescale, so paleobiogeography can provide a more complete picture of patterns and processes. Through the fossil record, paleobiogeography can monitor the evolution and coevolution of life on Earth, associating patterns with geological events and over long timescales, working with the field of biogeography to understand biogeographical processes.

=== Paleobiology ===
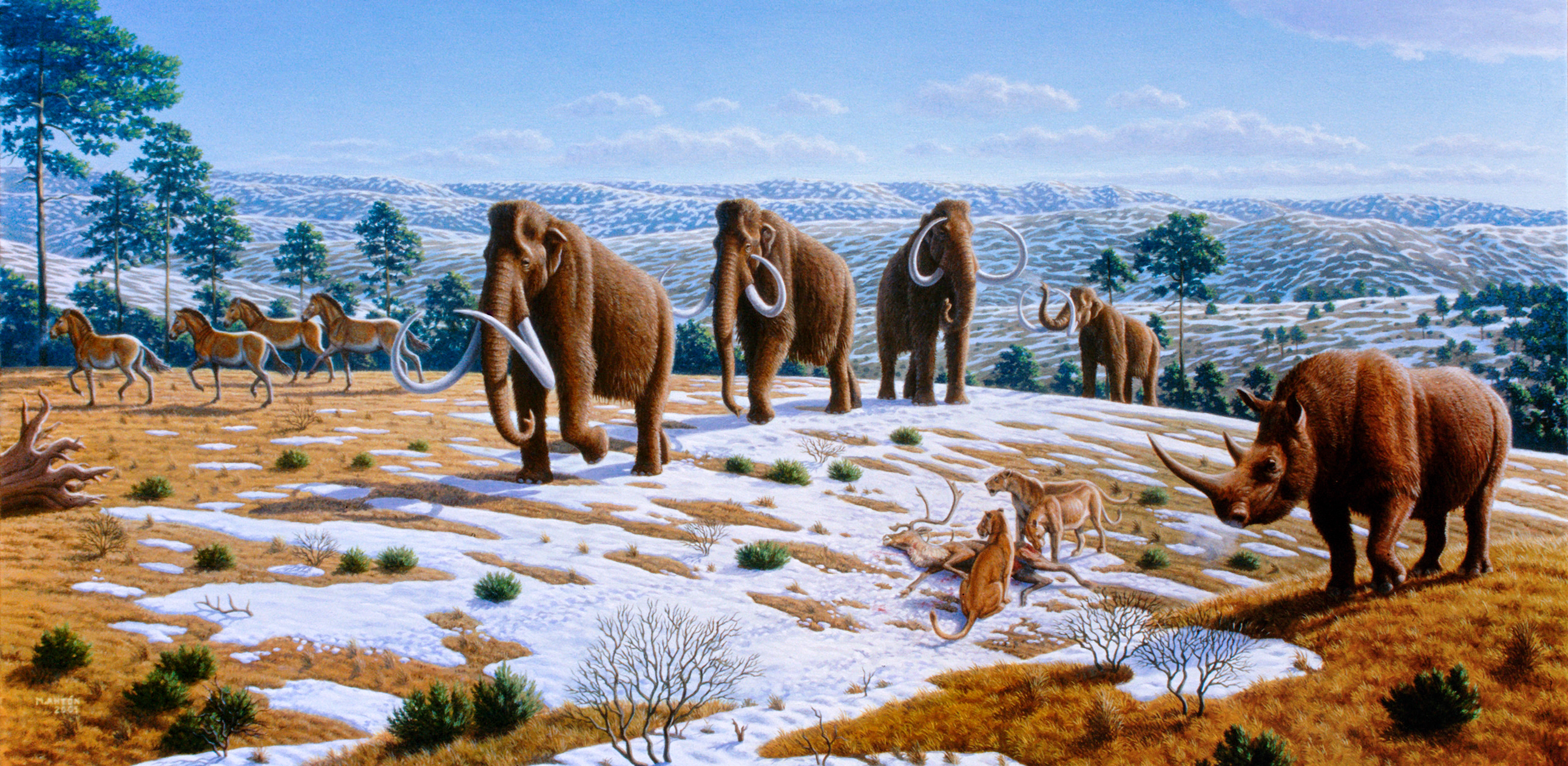
Restoration of ice age megafauna during the Pleistocene in northern Spain

Paleobiology is the study of the biology of extinct organisms. As a topic it has been around since the beginning of paleontology itself, as fossils are the remains of extinct organisms, but the areas of research covered by paleobiology have changed to capture much more theoretical thinking, studying the biological aspects of paleontology rather than geological topics like stratigraphy. This means there is a particular focus on evolution, adaptation, ecology, function, and behavior in paleobiology, especially of invertebrates which are far more common in the fossil record. Darwin's work on evolution was largely paleobiological in nature, drawing from paleontology, geology and biology, but also pushed paleontology into the background as the incompleteness of the fossil record became a hindrance to advancements in evolution. The first use of "paleobiology" as a word came in 1893, but it was the work of Othenio Abel in the 1910s that established "päleobiologie" as the study of biologically informed paleontology. Franz Nopcsa is also understood to have been a pioneer of paleobiology, and one of the first paleontologists to use histology and the interpret the paleophysiology of extinct animals. Biological questions did not change the field of paleontology greatly until the general transformation of the field in the 1950s and 1960s with new approaches to the fossil record and a differing view on the place of paleontology as a discipline. Paleontology was no longer seen as a subdivision of geology but instead as a field of biology or a field of its own, able to be grounded in theoretical thinking and assessed numerically. Paleontology was suggested to be educated as two separate areas: stratigraphy and paleobiology, with significant overlap and interconnection. Throughout following decades paleobiology would expand to encompass many theoretical fields related to evolution or extinction, and become a feature of museums and universities supporting the connection between paleontology and biology.

Many of the fields of paleontology can be seen as part of the study of paleobiology, and paleontologists themselves may be better referred to as paleobiologists. Evolution and paleoecology are large parts of the change towards paleobiology and major areas of study and advancements of the field. Theoretical thinking and analysis of evolution has advanced and improved applications of the fossil record. Studies of taphonomy, evolutionary paleoecology, diversity, behavior, trace fossils, and the paleoenvironment all fall under the breadth of paleoecology. Paleobiology is able to inform on questions about the life appearances of organisms, their ways of communicating or reproducing, their growth, and how they survived and died out. Effective paleobiology requires knowledge of biological fields (evolution, genetics, systematics, evolutionary developmental biology, biogeography, ecology, biochemistry), geological fields (sedimentology, stratigraphy, Earth history, isotopes, geochemistry, taphonomy), statistics and applied math, and often even computer science. Findings and studies in biology are relevant and applicable to paleontology, and as a result the findings of paleontology become relevant to biology. The available information to study between the two fields is different, forcing paleontological studies to be more integrated while biological studies are more focused, but this is an opportunity for collaborative work.

=== Paleoclimatology ===
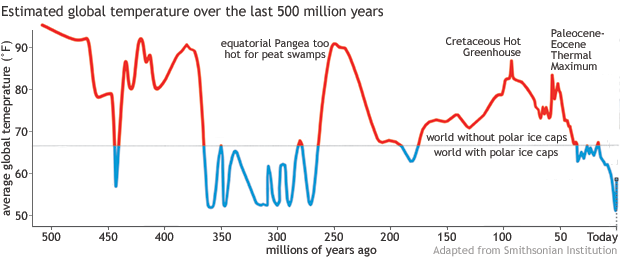
Estimated global temperature across the last 500 million years

Paleoclimatology is the study of the ancient climates, and is a "paleo-science" alongside paleoecology and paleoceanography. Studies on the climate before and during the Quaternary, where direct measurements become available, are beginning to converge in scope, but the term "paleoclimatology" remains often restricted to the former. Before the identification and acceptance of plate tectonics, paleoclimatology had been applied from the observation that fossils were sometimes found where the climate was currently not suitable to that organism. Little discussion was had about the changing of the climate beyond the Last Glacial Maximum, so paleoclimatology was restricted to the climate of the Quaternary. Inconsistencies between climate-significant rocks and current geography were not able to be reconciled until plate tectonics demonstrates that climate zones were constant but the landmasses beneath them would change. Indicators of the paleoclimate could be found in certain types of rocks, which coupled with reconstructions of the paleogeography showed that climate zones in the past were roughly the same as today, with exceptions. During the time of the supercontinent Pangaea, arid regions were believed to be generally lower in latitude that at other times in the past, which would be explained by the monsoonal nature of the continent in the 1970s and the understanding that atmospheric circulation of monsoons also affected the regionality of climates. Ocean drilling of core samples from the seabed were then used to identify isotopes that could examine the proportions of oxygen and carbon dioxide over time to illustrate the warmth and coldness of ocean waters. In some sense, global paleoclimatology would not be possible without these ocean drilling programs. Numerical modelling of the paleoclimate was employed to further the field, though it struggles with the polar regions and the climate of continental interiors. Further development of paleoclimatology will likely focus on the impact to humans of the alterations to the climate that are occurring, and use information from the past to make predictions about the future.

=== Paleoecology ===
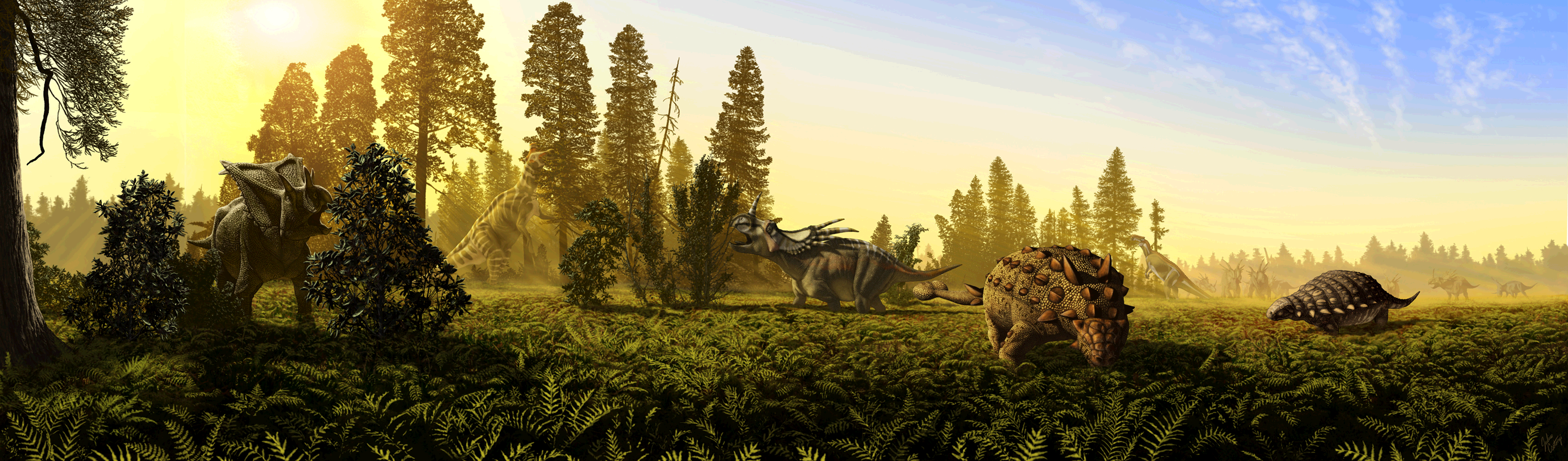
Restoration of the paleoenvironment and fauna of the Dinosaur Park Formation

Paleoecology is a diverse field of paleontology that relates to the reconstruction of lifestyles and ecosystems of ancient life. While we know much about the evolution of life, less is understood about the interactions and behavior of organisms. The large amount of speculation involved in paleoecological interpretations means it may be disregarded at times, but a developing use of numerical and statistical techniques allows for quantitative assessments of paleoecological hypotheses. Paleoecology also investigates the long-term changing of ecologies and the balancing of chemical, biological, and physical changes of the world. Fossil animals and plant do not normally preserve in completion or in their undisturbed habitats, with scavenging, erosion, or transportation complicating their interpretation. The study of these complications from fossilization is taphonomy, which is its own significant and developing field of paleontology. The combination of reconstructions of ancient environments with the evolution of these environments over time is termed evolutionary paleoecology. Global patterns of diversity can be investigated through paleoecology, suggesting large bursts of diversification and the temporal separation of major faunas forms. However, these interpretations of changing diversity may be due to biases towards the preservation and discovery of more recent environments over older ones, where the field of taphonomy can become significant.

Paleoecology has been able to identify several large-scale patterns in evolution and different faunas. It has been interpreted that communities living nearshore exhibit earlier diversification before spreading to offshore environments, or that tropical latitudes exhibit greater diversification. A largely detritus-feeding Cambrian fauna appears to be replaced by a suspension-feeding Paleozoic fauna, before itself being replaced by a modern fauna of marine invertebrates, though these faunas and their distinctiveness have also been questioned. Some communities show very little modification over time in a form of statis with stable composition, which changes during brief periods of turnover before stabilizing again. Competition and coevolution driving evolution may be studied through the fossil record, as well as predation and other forms of species interactions. The study of trace fossils, ichnology, also related to paleoecology as the study of fossils arising from behavioral patterns in organisms. Paleobiogeography, paleoclimatology and conservation paleobiology are also related fields of paleoecology, with the latter in particular being relevant to policies that attempt to preserve biodiversity.

=== Paleohistology ===
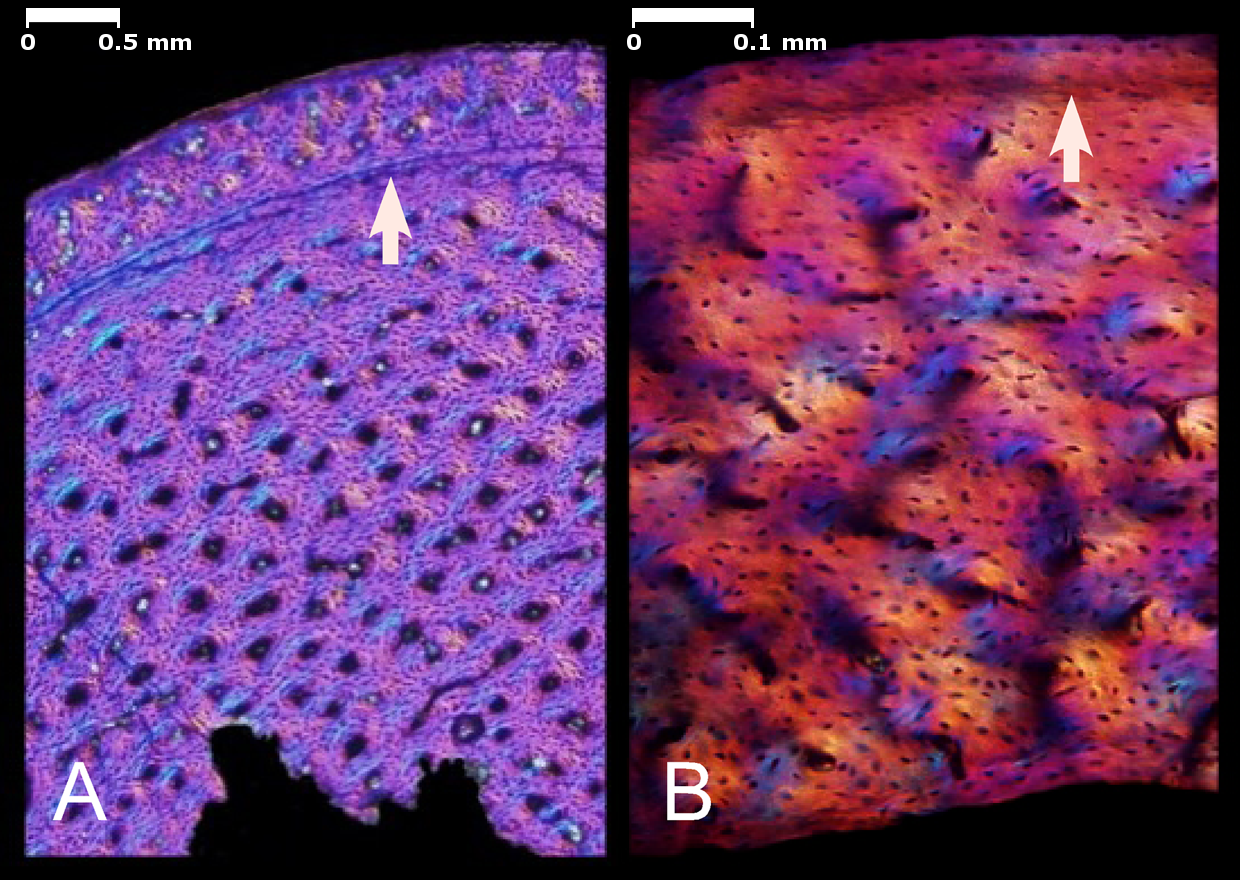
Bone microstructure of dinosaurs Shuvuuia and Confuciusornis showing lines of arrested growth

Paleohistology is the study of the hard tissues of fossils, analogous to the field of histology that studies biological tissues. The field is comparatively restricted as fossils preserve only superficial tissue structure and not molecules that can be found in modern histology, but it still has a long history following the use of microscopes to study both living and extinct organisms. Fossilization changes the composition of bones and to a lesser extent teeth, though their histology can still be examined through thin sections. The first use of thin sections in studying tissues in fossils was that of Richard Owen in a set of volumes in the 1840s that included dinosaurs and pterosaurs, which was simultaneously the first large comparative study of hard tissue histology. The microscopic structure of the bones, dermal armor, and teeth of early vertebrates and fossil fish was studies soon after, though polished bone surfaces were used rather than thin sections. The hard tissue structure of these early vertebrates has been used to classify them and separate jawless vertebrates (ostracoderms) from those with jaws such as placoderms and acanthodians. Similarly, the paleohistology of tetrapods has been used as evidence of both their classifications and their function. The internal structure of bones of many tetrapods can be used to identify their age quantitatively through the count of growth arrest lines. Paleohistology combines structural knowledge with functional interpretations and evolutionary processes to help understand evolution.

=== Paleopathology ===
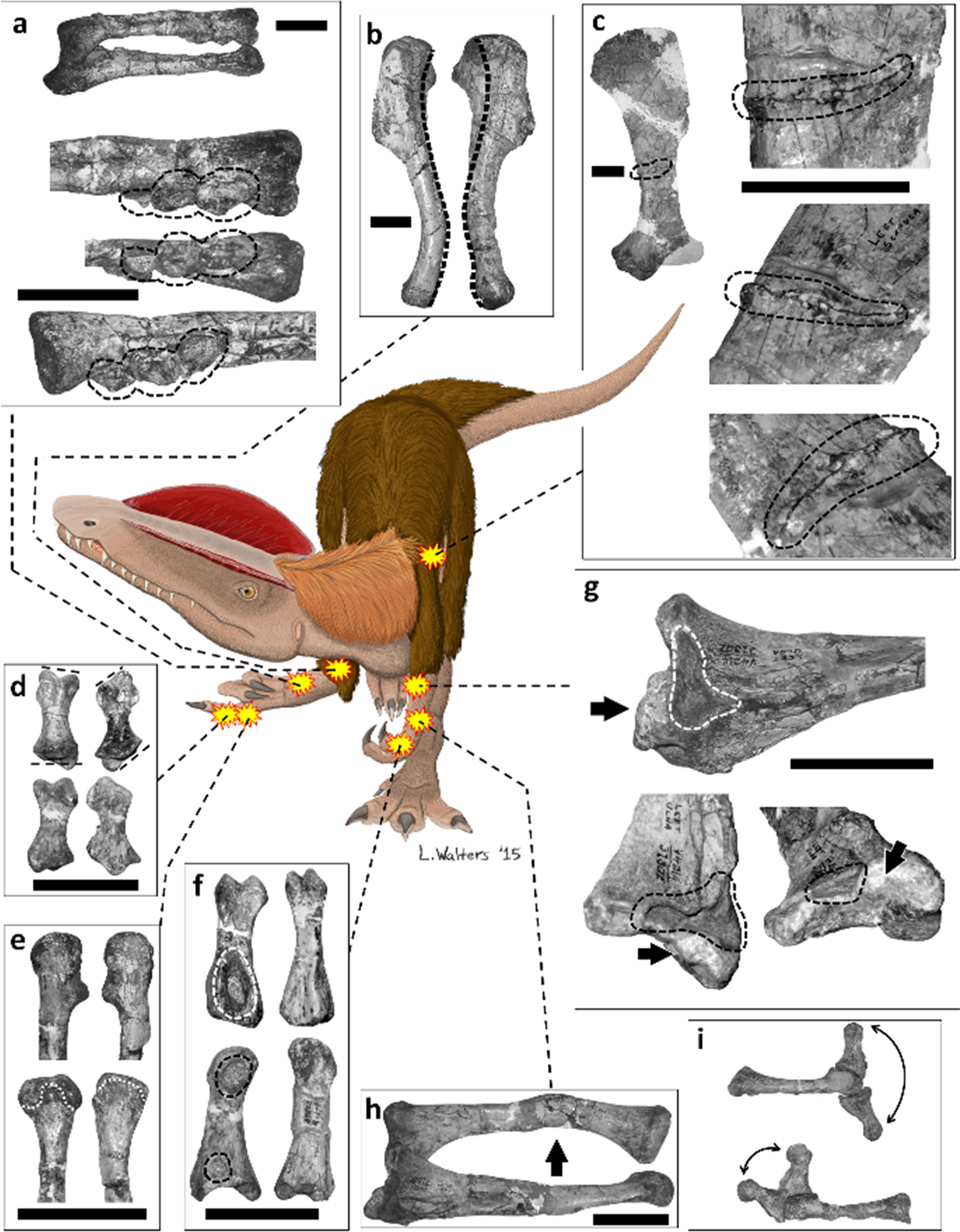
Paleopathologies in bones of a Dilophosaurus specimen, plotted onto a life restoration

Paleopathology is the study of ancient disease, with the clarification that "disease" is not limited to pathogens but also any other impairments that can impact health. Though paleopathology is most often discussed in the context of archaeology and human history, it has also included the study of pathologies in any fossil organism since the word was first introduced by Robert Schufeldt in 1892. It is important to separate pathological conditions from alterations that have arisen due to taphonomy, and from that distinction modern diagnostic techniques can be used to interpret the causes and impacts of pathologies in fossil organisms. Biomolecular studies have been able to isolate genetic material in fossil animals and humans to identify specific pathogens, and questioning the strength of these identifications has led to re-evaluations of the history of disease in humans and a more nuanced approach towards the study of disease in humans. Multiple factors can cause skeletal lesions that preserve well in fossils and it can be difficult to distinguish these causes due to not being able to confidently identify causes of mortality and predispositions for vulnerability. Most of the focus of paleopathology remains on human disease, though the field of animal paleopathology emerged in 1999 and expanded to cover much of the same scope of studies as human paleopathology. Specific studies into the stress fractures in the bones of dinosaurs have used their presence and distribution to identify the activity levels of the impacted animals such as running, migrating, or restraining prey.

=== Paleophysiology ===
Paleophysiology is the study of how ancient life coped with its chemical and physical surroundings. Much is known about physiological changes on a short time scale, but less so about long-term responses including genetic modification. Paleophysiological analysis can investigate how species evolved or went extinct from gradual or rapid environmental change and apply that to modern scenarios to predict responses in the future. Past geological records can be found that resemble those predicted for the future. Extinctions of ancient organisms tend to be selective to certain traits like metabolic rate, temperature tolerance, photosynthesis and homeostasis, but much is not yet understood about the physiology of ancient organisms. The most useful tool for assessing paleophysiology is through the studies of "living fossils" that has presumably changed very little physiologically over long periods of time and therefore can be used to indicate paleophysiological conditions. It remains largely unknown how calcifying organisms built robust skeletons at times when atmospheric carbon dioxide levels were high, but the understanding of this process can be applicable to current rising carbon dioxide levels. Similar work may explain how photosynthetic corals and reefs can exist in times of higher acidity and temperatures as in the past. Plants respond to changes in temperature, precipitation, soil quality, and atmospheric gas composition, which can be seen in their fossils. Fossils offer a large array of phenotypes and physiologies that are rare or absent in modern biotas making it possible to assess adaptations that are not found in living species.

=== Paleoichnology ===
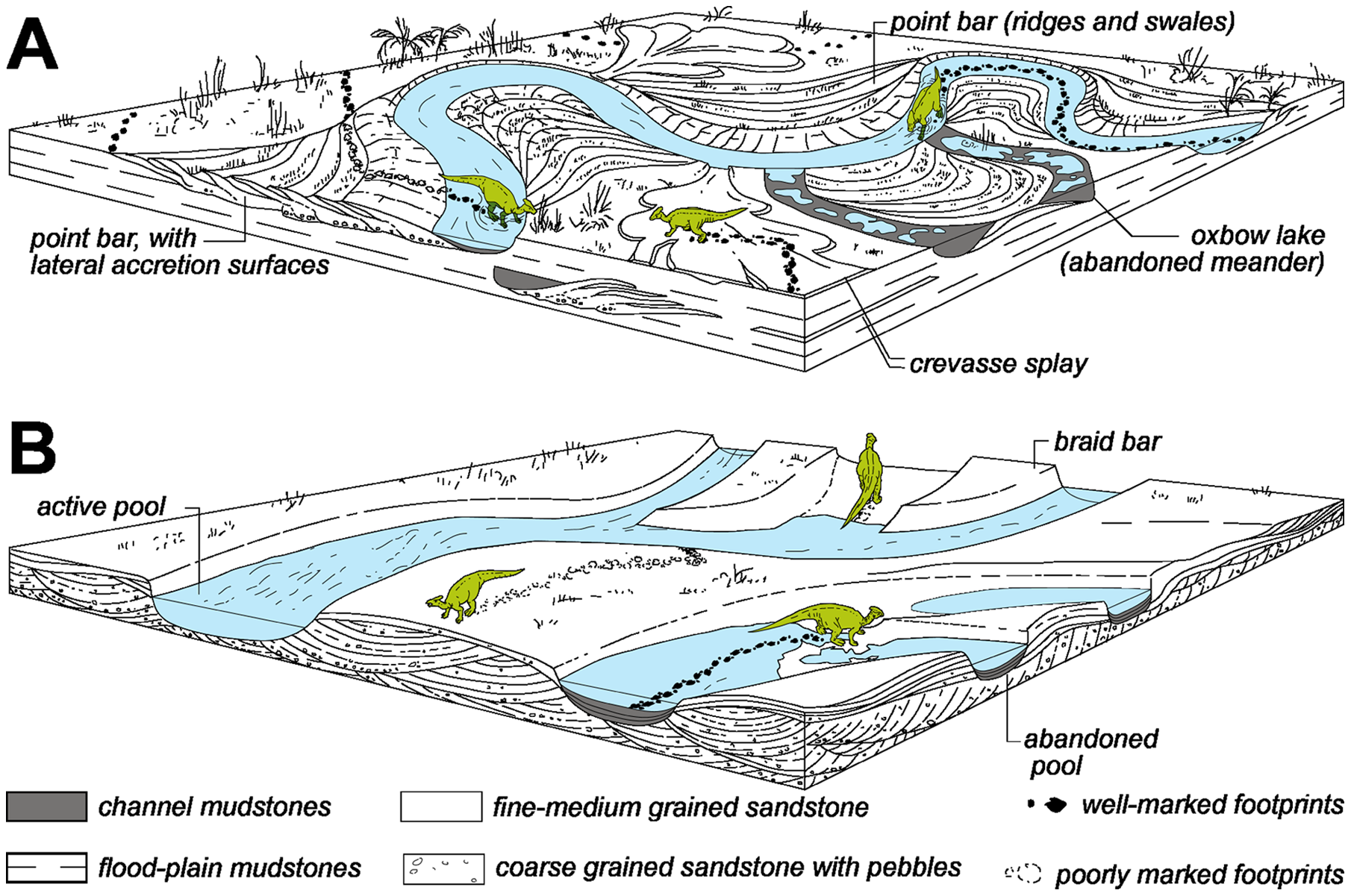
Diagram showing how dinosaur footprints preserve in different deposits

Paleoichnology is the study of trace fossils, which can display interactions between organisms or other aspects of behavior. Common trace fossils are the burrows of bivalves or worms in shallow water, feeding traces on the deep ocean floor, and the footprints of dinosaurs and other animals in mud and sand beside bodies of water. The description of dinosaur tracks goes back to the early 19th century, but larger discussions about paleoichnology and its uses came with the reidentification of supposed plant fossils as invertebrate trackways in the 1880s to 1920s, where modern analogues were introduced to interpret these trace fossils. Advancements by Adolf Seilacher in the 1960s identified the shortcomings of ichnology: trace fossils were limited in their ability to establish the paleoenvironment, and as they lacked a consistent naming scheme it was difficult to classify and compare trace fossils. Seilacher expanded upon ichnotaxonomy as a way to classify trace fossils according to the behavior that caused them allowing the identification of sedimentary or environmental contexts. From this, ichnotaxonomy differentiates between trace fossils created by tracks, burrows or borings, excrement, and other types of behaviors, rather than describing the organism that created them. One animal can make many different kinds of traces, and one trace can be made my many different kinds of animals.

Footprints made by vertebrates can often be compared more with the organism that could have created them, but this identification is not definitive and can be reinterpreted over time. Different kinds of trace fossils can also be dependent on the type of sediment the organisms were interacting with, with feeding traces on the ocean floor fossilizing differently over different substrates, and trackways of vertebrates being able to be followed across distances. The understanding that trace fossils directly correlate to sediments means that they can be used as indicators of environment types, termed ichnofacies and paleosols. In rare cases trace fossils can also be preserved alongside body fossils, such as the dinosaur Oryctodromeus that is the first to show definitive evidence of burrowing behavior as its body fossils were found buried within a fossilized burrow. Trace fossils are able to be used as markers of biochronology and biogeography for correlation, and some such as coprolites can be used to understand the diets, diseases, parasites, or climates of the organisms that created them. Some trace fossils show evidence of gregariousness in animals travelling together in the same direction or congregating at a site, while others can show pathologies in the form of uneven gaits or pathologic foot impressions. Trackways of footprints can even be used to estimate the size and speed of their creators and their courtship and nesting behaviors.

=== Taphonomy ===
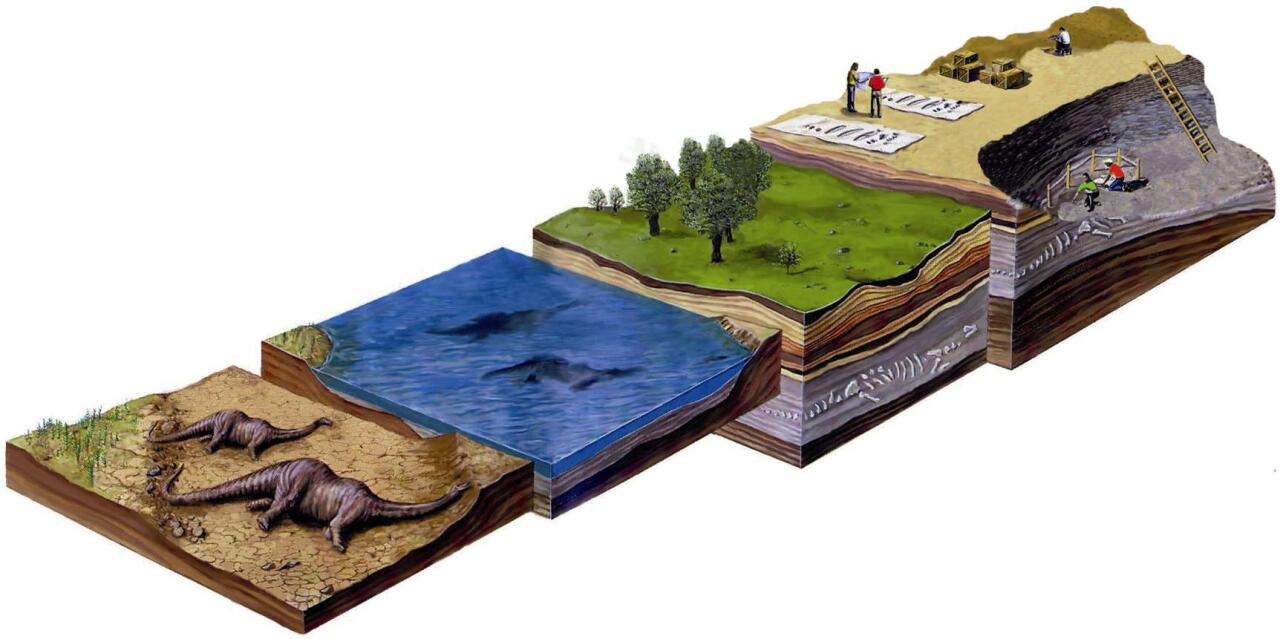
Fossilization process of a pair of sauropod dinosaurs

Taphonomy is the field of study of the process of fossilization and the processes that occur between burial and discovery. The term taphonomy was introduced in 1940 by Ivan Yefremov as a new branch of paleontology, though the consideration of how an organism becomes a fossil predates his work. Taphonomy did not gain prominence as a field until the 1960s when it became important to consider how fossilized deposits relate to their original ecosystems, and the incompleteness of the fossil record became important for evolutionary theories such as punctuated equilibrium. Taphonomic studies of this time involved experimentations to see how the properties of water can transport, sort, or bury bones. It is unlikely that an organism will become a fossil after death, as many factors can damage or destroy both soft and hard tissues before they are buried. The hardest parts of an organism, such as shells or skeletons, are the most likely to survive to be buried and fossilized, though in rare cases soft tissues can be preserved as well. If a dead organism is buried immediately, and particularly in an anaerobic environment where decay is slowed or stopped, a complete body fossil including both soft and hard tissues may be formed, but even then different chemical or geological processes can alter the fossil, through the mineralization of organic material, or the forming of concretions around them.

When not buried immediately, many different taphonomic processes can be involved in the completeness and type of preservation. The transport of organisms from their original position can result in disarticulation or the incompleteness of material, and exposure to scavengers or the surrounding environment can result in decay, fragmentation, or abrasion. After burial the rock containing fossils may be flattened geologically or deformed by the distortion of metamorphic activity. Plants can commonly be fossilized as layers of carbon where all soluble elements of the plant have been removed, and large accumulations of these carbonaceous materials may be transformed into coal seams. Many filters influence the preservation and recovery of fossils, all of which impact the completeness of the fossil record. Common organisms in an environment, that lived around shallow bodies of water with little natural erosion is more likely to be preserved, and after preservation is more likely to be discovered if the rock does not undergo severe metamorphosis, is moved to the surface geologically, and is in a location where it can be exposed to humans. Nearly every paleobiological study incorporates a taphonomic assessment and recognizes biases in the fossil record that can impact their reconstructions.

== Cultural significance ==
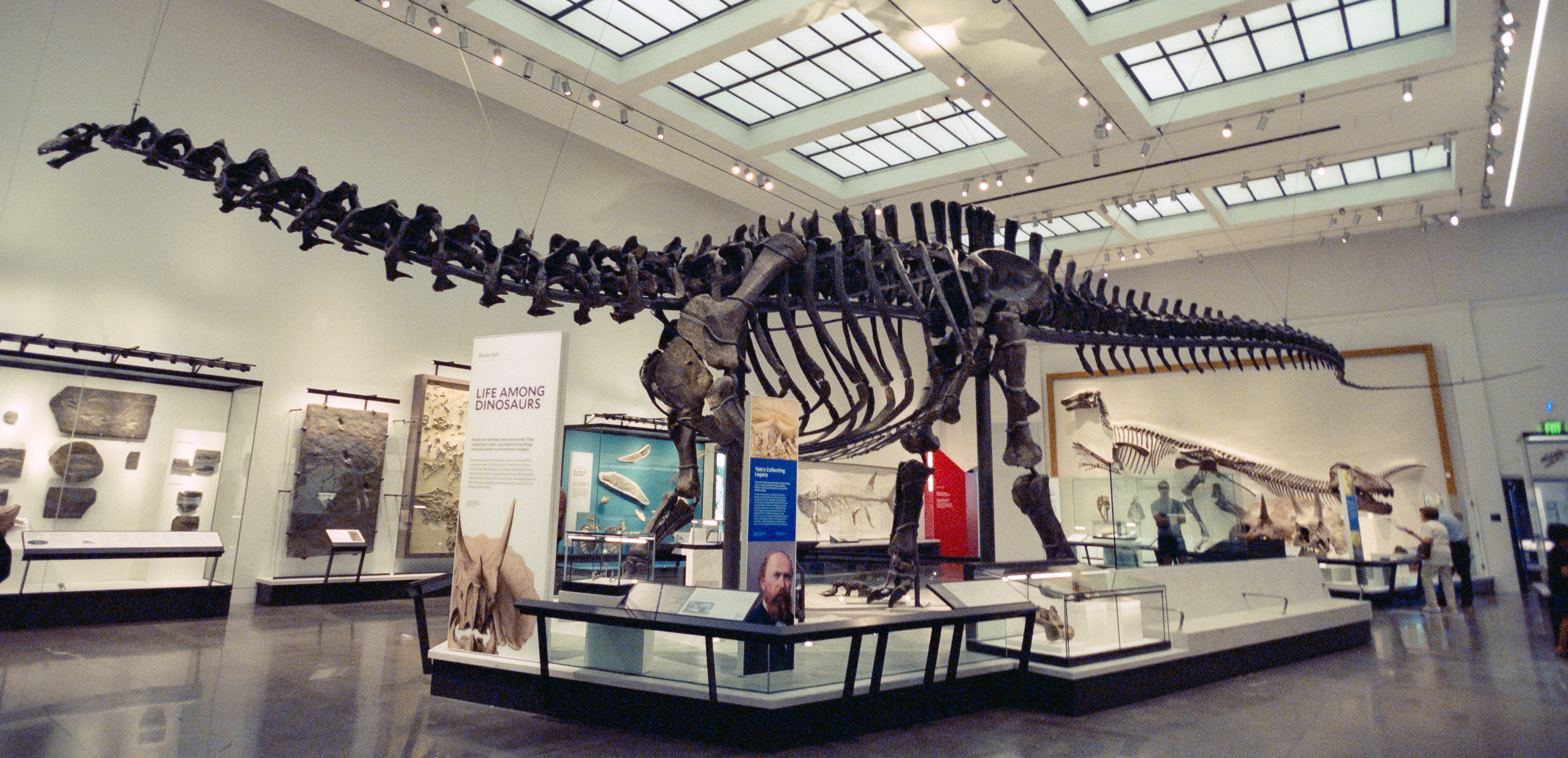
The skeleton of a dinosaur, Brontosaurus, on public display at the Peabody Museum of Natural History

Paleontology is one of the most high profile of the sciences. Discoveries, especially concerning dinosaurs or human evolution, are commonly reported in the mass media, with only astrophysics and global health comparable in the level of press attention. Prehistoric life is inspiration for toys, television and films, computer games, and attractions in tourism. Environments and organisms from the deep past are some of the most familiar concepts drawn from modern science, such as the dinosaurs Tyrannosaurus, Triceratops and Brontosaurus, early humans like the Neanderthal and Homo floresiensis, extinct megafauna like mammoths and sabre-toothed cats, and invertebrates like trilobites and ammonites. Paleontology academically is not a particularly well-financed field of science; the operational budget of the American Museum of Natural History in 2021 was $178 million while the budget of the 2018 film Jurassic World: Fallen Kingdom was $516.1 million. The influence of paleontology in public consciousness may be due to a number of causes such as the mystery, the immense scale of time, the size of some organisms, or the similarities between myths of dragons and giants and their representation in extinct faunas. Paleontologists draw from public funding and use appeals to gain sponsorships, but the public aspect also overshadows some portions of the field to the benefit of others. There is an overwhelming focus in paleontology on the study of dinosaurs or specific geographical regions, with the most iconic taxa almost exclusively coming from the late 19th and early 20th century excavations in North America. The marketing to children of paleontological items can make the field be regarded as "childish" and undermine the utility of the science in popular consciousness.

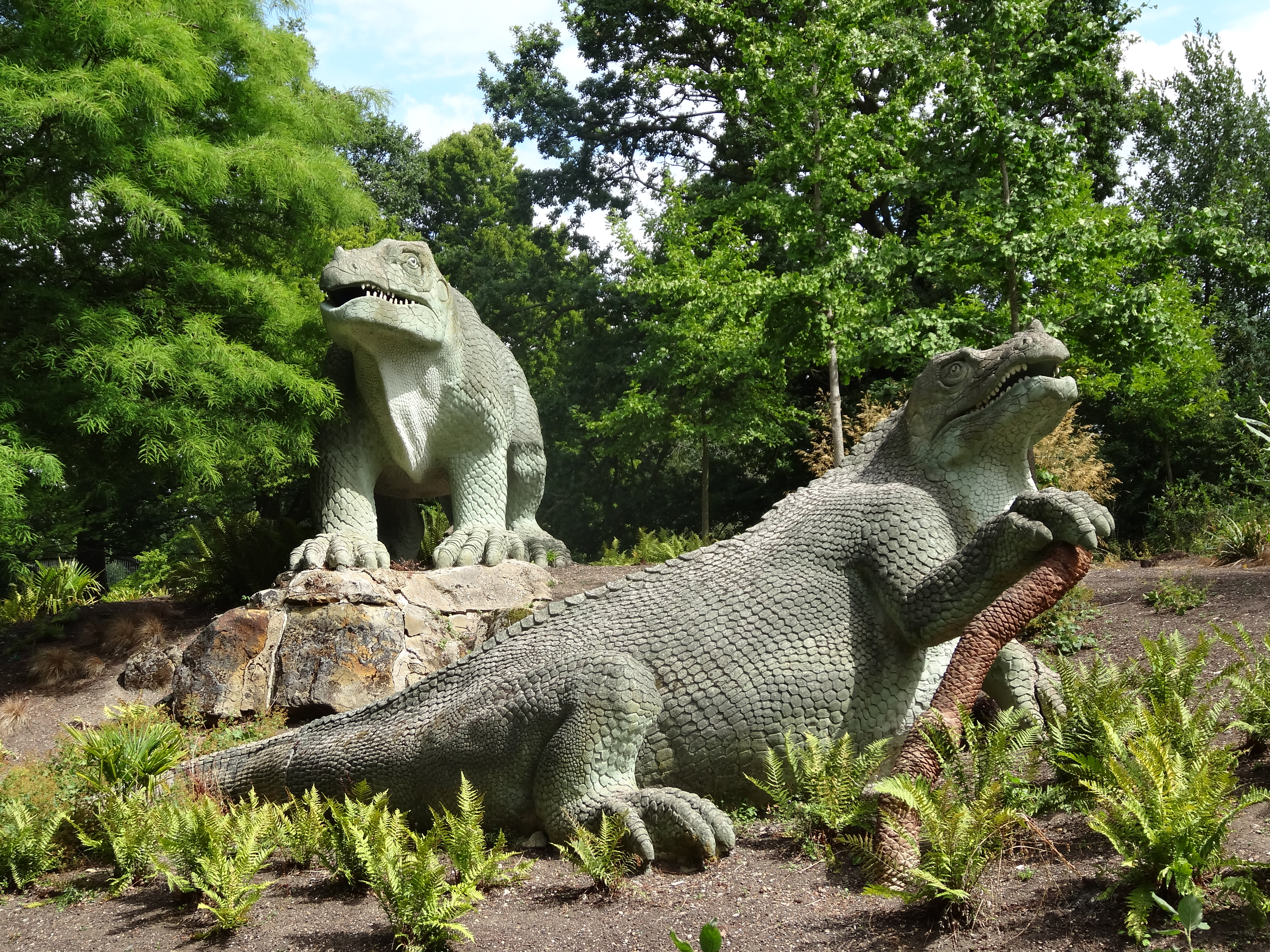
Victorian Iguanodon sculptures in Crystal Palace Park

Public perception of paleontology goes back to mythological interpretations of fossils' discovery by numerous indigenous peoples of many continents. Traditional Chinese medicine made use of Pleistocene mammal fossils as "dragon bones" or "dragon teeth"; indigenous peoples of Australia and North America made reference to landforms and fossils; and fossils have been interpreted as Nephilim, mentioned in the Book of Genesis, by European and North American Christianity. Early reconstructions of deep time following the foundation of paleontology saw paleoartistic reconstructions of past ecosystems, including the creation of the Crystal Palace Dinosaurs sculptures and landscaping in the 1850s under the direction of Benjamin Waterhouse Hawkins. Hawkins would also create the first free-standing skeletal mount of a dinosaur in the 1860s: Hadrosaurus at the Academy of Natural Sciences in Philadelphia. The Bone Wars between American paleontologists Othniel Charles Marsh and Edward Drinker Cope in the late 19th century engaged with the media at the time, and has since been used as a common popular narrative of paleontology through novels, comics, popular books, and even a musical. Following Marsh and Cope, a second American dinosaur rush occurred at the start of the 20th century when new museums and institutions aimed to excavate and display the highest-quality dinosaur fossils or replicas of them, accompanied by paleoart, news media, and exchanges with overseas institutions. This exploitation for popular appeal also intertwined paleontology of the time with imperialism, as fossils from Africa, Asia, and South America were excavated and taken by North American and European institutions.

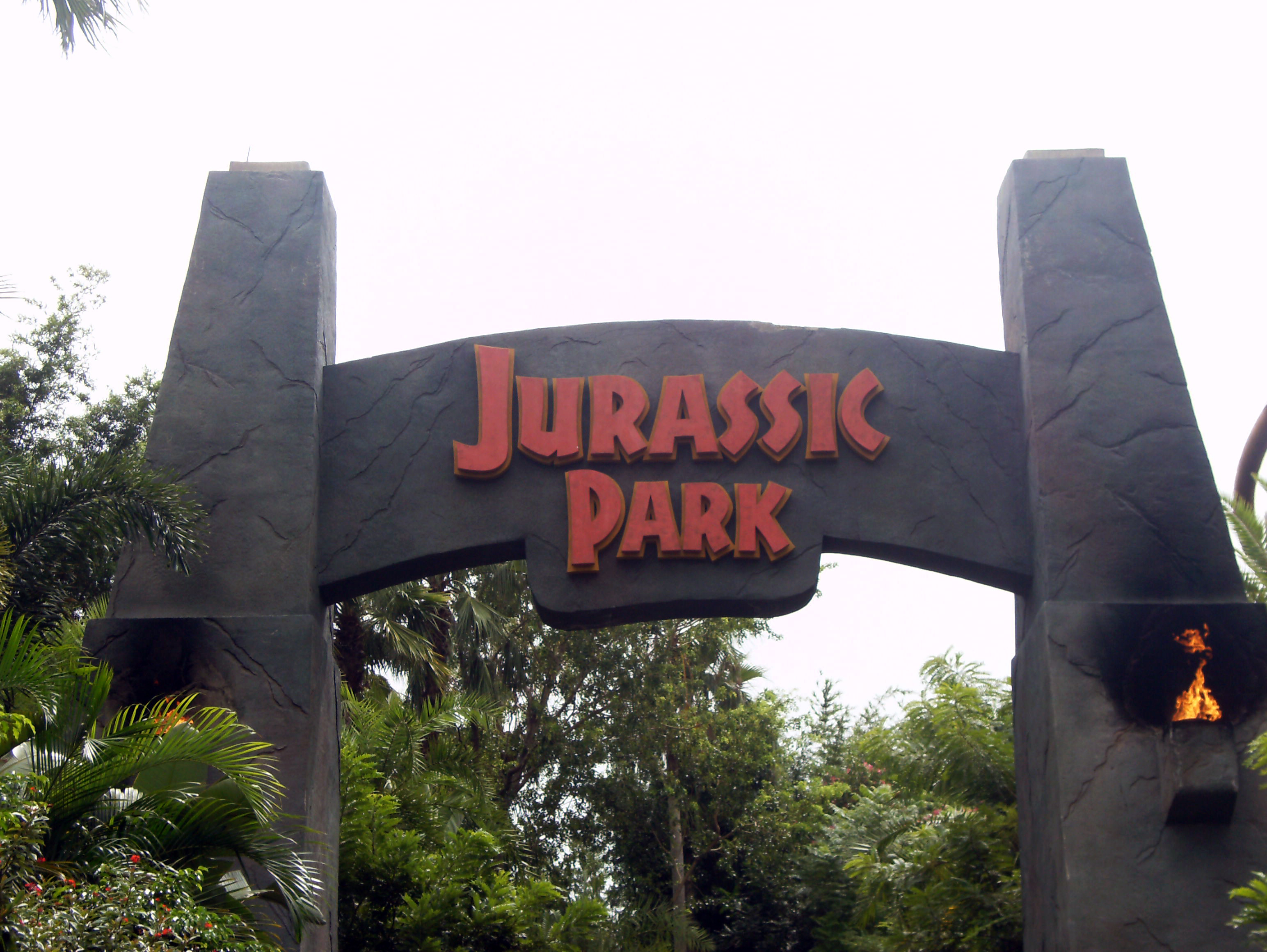
Entrance arch to Jurassic Park at Universal Islands of Adventure

Further public engagement of paleontology has taken the form of fictional novels and films focused on paleontology and dinosaurs, beginning with stone-age Europeans in stories of the 1890s, but notably with the publication of The Lost World by Arthur Conan Doyle in 1912. Paleontology would be characterized by many tropes in the 1920s to 1940s, including film adaptation of the book as well as King Kong and Fantasia. Popular representations of paleontology declined coinciding with the Cold War, but resurged in the 1970s with numerous popular works such as The Dinosaur Heresies by paleontologist Robert Bakker and papers by John Ostrom that reframed dinosaurs as active animals in a time termed the "dinosaur renaissance". The most significant establishment of paleontology in public was in the 1990s with the publications of the Jurassic Park novel by Michael Crichton and the subsequent Steven Spielberg film, where the story frames warmings about scientific development and genetic technology. The expansion of interest in paleontology has been met with the creation of new institutions globally to study and preserve fossils, but the focus since the Jurassic Park works has been on dinosaurs. New media have risen to paleontological blogs and podcasts and a greater online presence of those in the field. Conjectural forms of paleoart have arisen that engage with new science, and the boundaries between an artist, hobbyist, and professional have blurred. Paleontology has significant amounts of public outreach to drive its engagement and maintain its presence in the public sphere, and this public significance has in turn led to additional resources, recognition, and funding for the science.

Palaeontology has contributed to tourism in some areas, for example the Jurassic Coast and the Isle of Wight (both in southern England), Peace River (Florida), and Dinosaur National Monument which is spread across Colorado and Utah.
