= Musée d'archéologie et d'histoire naturelle de Montbéliard =

Coordinates: 47°30′34″N 6°48′03″E

The Musée d'archéologie et d'histoire naturelle de Montbéliard is a natural history museum in Montbéliard, France dedicated to the work of Georges Cuvier, a major figure in the establishment of the disciplines of paleontology and comparative anatomy.

== History ==
The "Cuvier Gallery" displays the work of Georges Cuvier, the founder of scientific paleontology. It features regional archaeological collections spanning from Prehistory (Mesolithic) to the Early Middle Ages, including fossils, dinosaurs, mammoths, Neanderthal remains, and Gallo-Roman artifacts, alongside a natural history gallery.

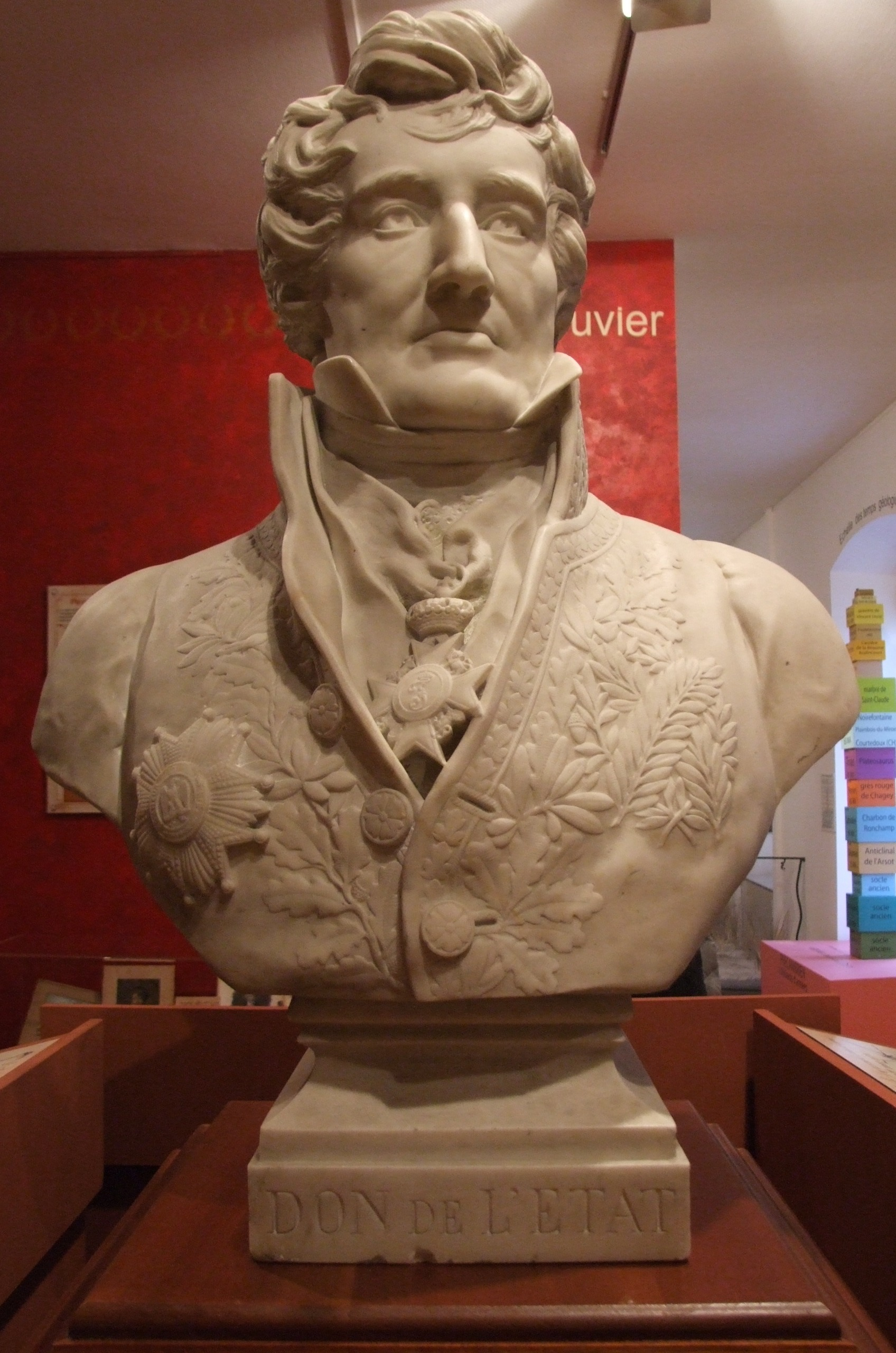
Georges Cuvier (1769–1832)

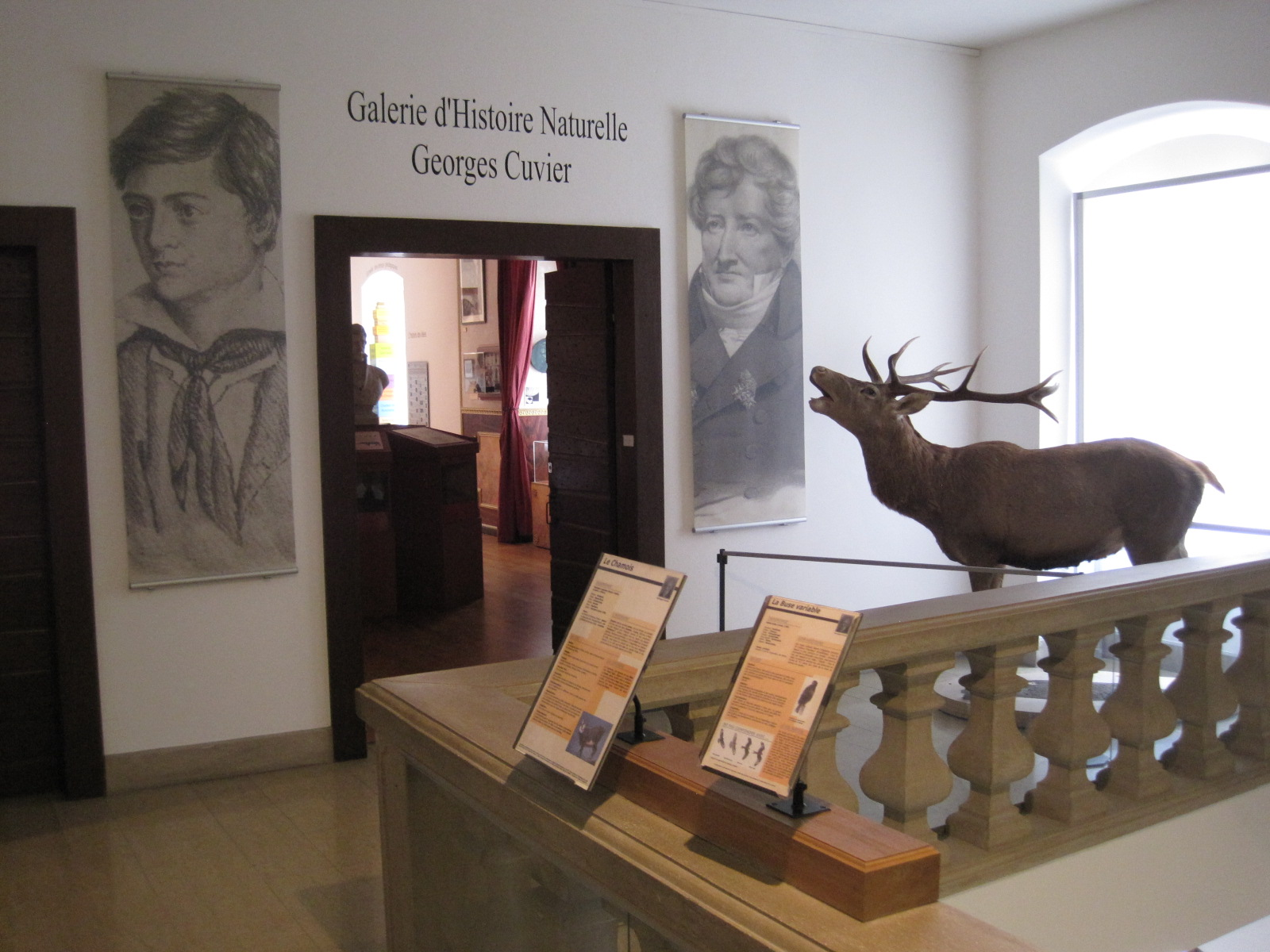
Georges Cuvier Gallery
