= Gregory Retallack =

American paleontologist (born 1951)

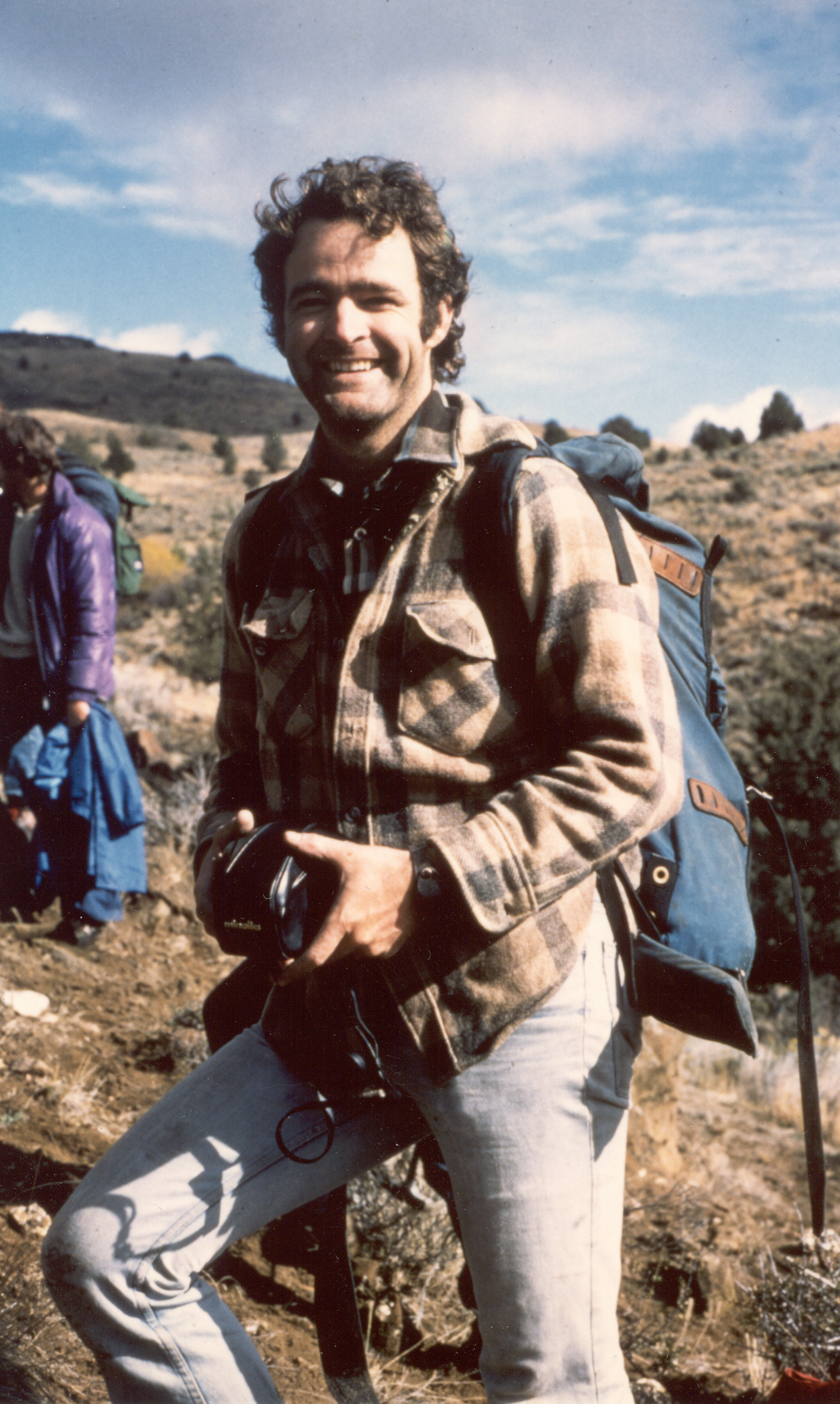
- Greg Retallack, near Suplee, central Oregon, 1982
- Born: 8 November 1951 (age 74); Hobart, Tasmania
- Citizenship: American and Australian
- Education: Macquarie University, University of New England (Australia)
- Known for: Paleopedology
- Spouse: Diane Retallack
- Scientific career
- Thesis: A biostratigraphy for terrestrial Triassic rocks of Gondwanaland (1978)
- Doctoral advisor: Rodney E. Gould
- Website: https://blogs.uoregon.edu/gregr/

Gregory John Retallack (born 8 November 1951) is an Australian paleontologist, geologist, and author who specializes in paleopedology, the study of fossil soils. He is a professor emeritus at University of Oregon and his research is primarily concerned with the fossil record of soils though Earth history. His research has included investigations into climate change, the extinction of dinosaurs, and the origins of upright walking humans. Retallack has controversially claimed that Ediacaran-era fossils represent terrestrial lichens as opposed to the consensus view that they present marine organisms including animals. He has written two books on paleopedology, and has appeared in numerous media shows.

== Biography ==
Retallack was born 8 November 1951 in Hobart, Australia. He attended school in Hurstville, and Epping, as well as The King's School, Parramatta. He studied biology and paleontology at Macquarie University where he received a B.A in 1973. He received a BSc Hons with University Medal in 1974 from the University of New England (Australia); and a PhD in 1978 in geology from the same university. After a postdoctoral fellowship at Indiana University Bloomington he joined the faculty at the University of Oregon in 1981. He was a professor in the Department of Geological Sciences since 1992, and Director of the Condon Collection of the University of Oregon Museum of Natural and Cultural History since 2009.

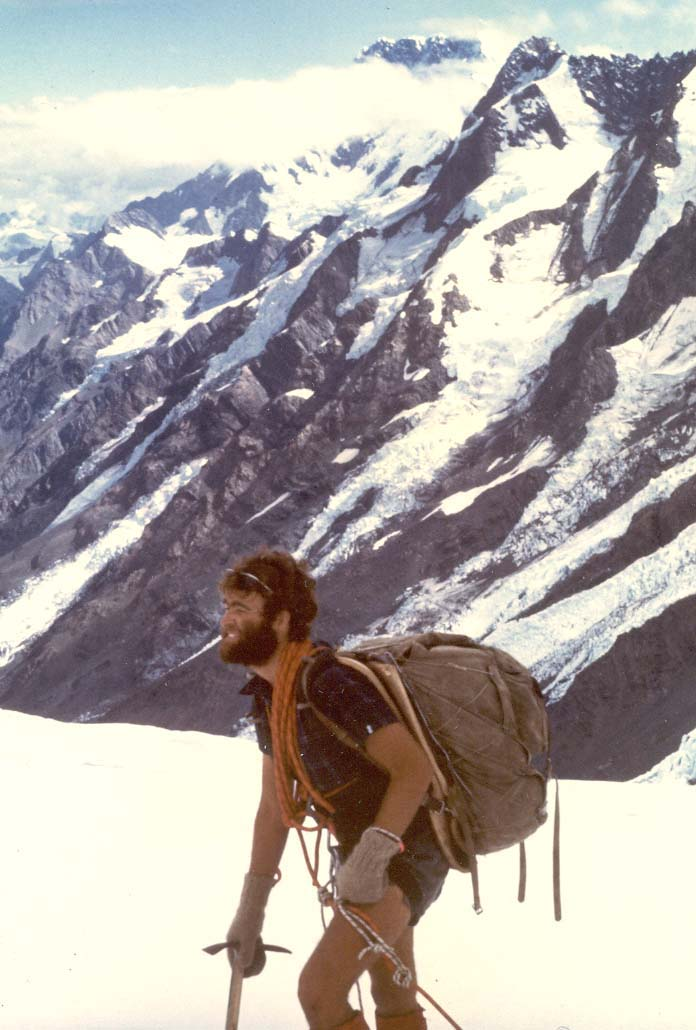
Retallack on Mount Cook, New Zealand, 1974

A fossil collector since a young age, Retallack was outspoken concerning federal seizure in 1993 of Sue (dinosaur) the skeleton of Tyrannosaurus rex excavated by Pete Larson.

== Work ==
=== Evolution of life on land ===
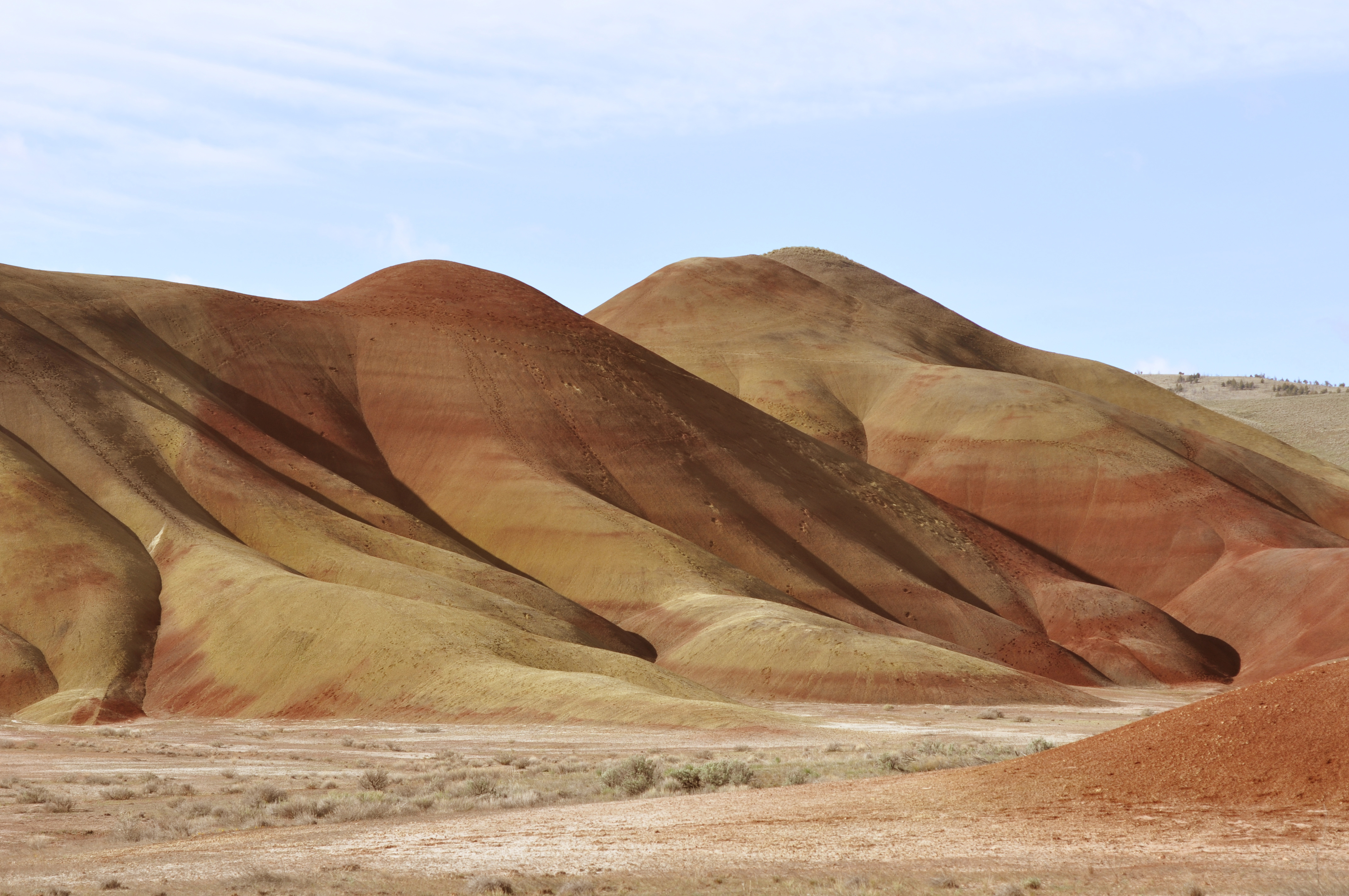
Oligocene fossil soils of well-drained woodlands (red bands) and swamps (black spots) in the Painted Hills, Oregon

Retallack's research focuses on the study of paleosols (fossilized soils) to reconstruct ancient environments. In 1973, he proposed that paleosols preserved beneath fossil plant horizons could provide data on ancient plant communities that plant fossils alone could not reveal. He has applied this approach to various stages of evolutionary history, offering hypotheses that sometimes challenge established scientific understanding.

==== Research findings ====
Retallack has used paleosols to investigate several major extinction and evolutionary events. Regarding climate change, he argued that the coevolution of grasslands and grazers over the past 50 million years drove global cooling via carbon biosequestration. In the field of human evolution, Retallack's fieldwork in Kenya concerning Proconsulidae (primates ancestral to humans) led him to suggest that the evolutionary transition to an upright stance occurred in woodland environments rather than in open savannas. Regulation of global temperature by the balance of plants and animals has been called the Proserpina Principle.

He has also applied this methodology to mass extinction events. Studying the Cretaceous-Paleogene boundary in Montana, he hypothesized that acid rain resulting from an extraterrestrial impact contributed to the extinction of dinosaurs. Similarly, his work in Antarctica on the Permian-Triassic boundary led to the hypothesis that the mass extinction was driven by a greenhouse gas crisis caused by methane released from coal intrusions during massive volcanic events (flood basalts). Furthermore, he has proposed a "woodland hypothesis" regarding the Devonian transition of vertebrates from fish to amphibians.

In 2013, Retallack identified supposed fossils in Paleoproterozoic paleosols from South Africa, which he named Diskagma. He identified the species as a fungus comparable to the living Geosiphon. Dated to 2.2 billion years old, these fossils would push back the record of life on land significantly from the previously accepted record of 1.2 billion years

Retallack's work interpreting the Avalon and White Sea assemblages of the Ediacaran biota as lichens has been challenged. His proposal that Ediacaran fossils were preserved in subaerial paleosols, and thus not marine fossils, has been supported by a minority of researchers but not other paleontologists. Nature called it a "controversial claim" in a news report, in which paleontologist Guy Narbonne said "[I]t quickly became clear that there are simpler explanations for the features Retallack had validly noted, and most of us moved on to more promising explanations." Despite a majority of Ediacaran researchers who reject his claims based on a body of research, Retallack continues to test his position.

In 2020, Retallack and other researchers claimed to have found Dickinsonia fossils from Bhimbetka rock shelters, India. However, in 2023 other researchers found that the material was actually the decayed remnants of a beehive.

==== Media appearances ====
Retallack's work has been featured in several documentaries and science programs. His research on the Late Permian extinction appeared in the BBC's The Day the Earth Nearly Died and the Science Channel's Miracle Planet. Additionally, an episode of Prehistoric Predators on the National Geographic Channel covered his work on the Miocene of Panama. His findings regarding early life on land were also discussed on radio programs broadcast by National Public Radio, the Canadian Broadcast Corporation, and Oregon Public Broadcasting.

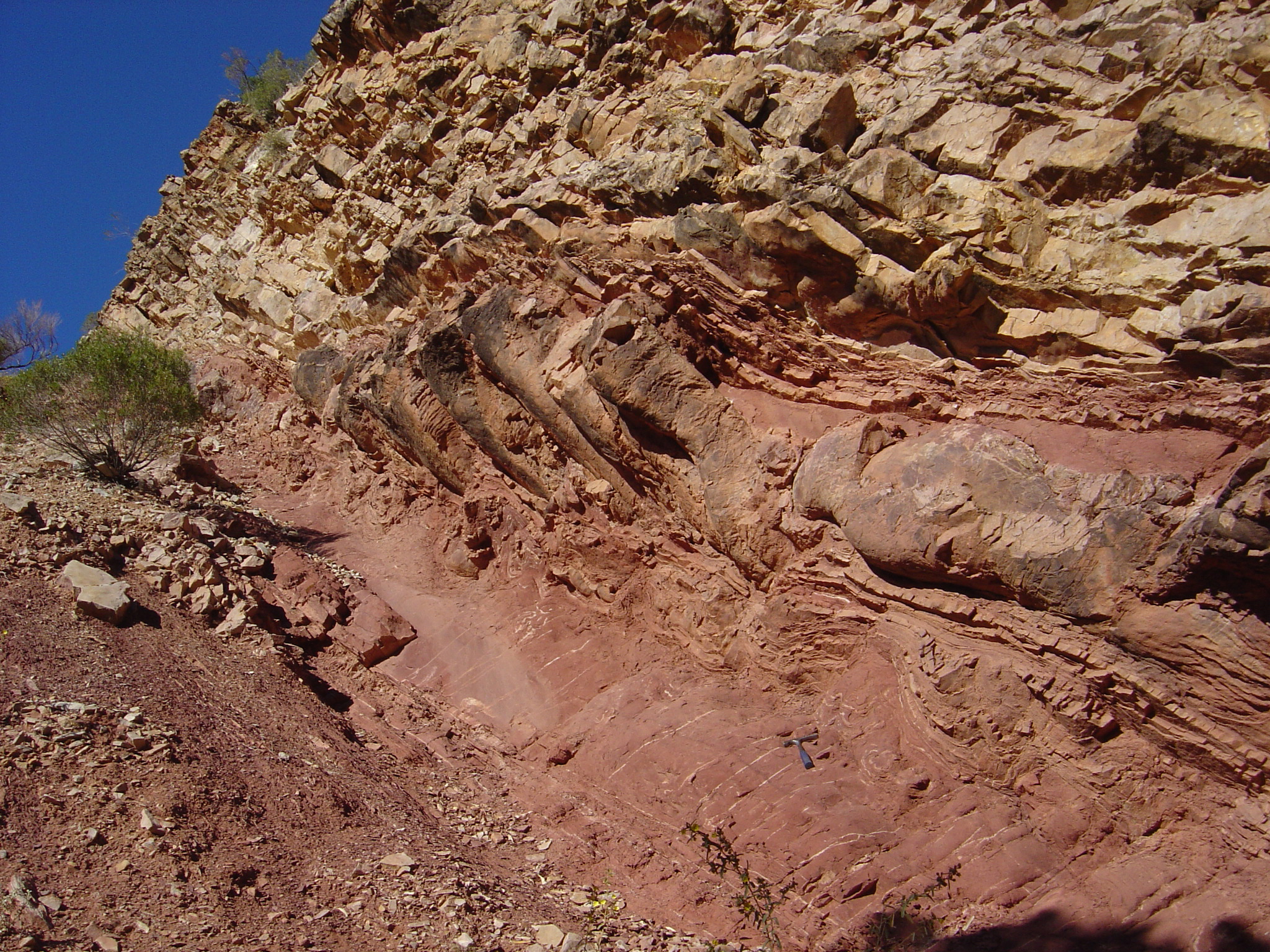
Paleosols (massive red bands) at horizons for Ediacaran fossils in Brachina Gorge, South Australia.

== Boards ==
Retallack has served as an associate or technical editor for such scientific journals as Geology, PALAIOS, and Journal of Sedimentary Research. His fellowships include the Geological Society of America, and the American Association for the Advancement of Science.

He served as the president and vice president of the Cordilleran Section of the Paleontological Society, of the Oregon Academy of Sciences, and of the University of Oregon Chapter of the Society of Sigma Xi.

== Awards and honors ==
Retallack has been honored for his research, including the Stillwell Award of the Geological Society of Australia, for best paper in the society journal in 1977, Ingerson Award of the Geochemical Society in 2015, and the Antarctica Service Medal of the U.S. National Science Foundation in 1999. He has been an invited lecturer throughout the U.S., and also to Germany, England, China, Thailand and India.

== Bibliography ==
Books

- Soils of the past: an introduction to paleopedology, 3rd edition, Wiley, Chichester, 2019, ISBN 978-1-119-53040-4
- A colour guide to paleosols, John Wiley and Sons, Chichester, 1997, ISBN 0-471-96711-4
- Soil grown tall: the epic saga of life from earth, Springer Nature, Cham, Switzerland, 2022, ISBN 978-3-030-88738-4

Selected publications

- Retallack, G. J.; Feakes, C. R. (1987). "Trace fossil evidence for Late Ordovician animals on land". Science. 235 (4784): 61–63. Bibcode:1987Sci...235...61R. doi:10.1126/science.235.4784.61. PMID 17769314. S2CID 37351505.
- Retallack, G. J.; Dugas, D. P.; Bestland, A. E. (1990). "Fossil soils and grasses of the earliest East African grasslands". Science. 247 (4948): 1325–1328. doi:10.1126/science.247.4948.1325. PMID 17843796. S2CID 46233081.
- Retallack, G. J.; Germán-Heins, J. (1994). "Evidence from paleosols for the geological antiquity of rain forest". Science. 265 (5171): 499–502. Bibcode:1994Sci...265..499R. doi:10.1126/science.265.5171.499. PMID 17781308. S2CID 44497635.
- Retallack, G. J. (1995). "Permian-Triassic life crisis on land". Science. 267 (5194): 77–80. Bibcode:1995Sci...267...77R. doi:10.1126/science.267.5194.77. PMID 17840061. S2CID 42308183.
- Retallack, G. J. (1997). "Early forest soils and their role in Devonian global change". Science. 276 (5312): 583–585. doi:10.1126/science.276.5312.583. PMID 9110975.
- Retallack, G. J. (2001). "A 300 million year record of atmospheric carbon dioxide from fossil plant cuticles". Nature. 411 (6835): 287–290. Bibcode:2001Natur.411..287R. doi:10.1038/35077041. PMID 11357126. S2CID 4430851.
- Retallack, G. J. (2008). "Rocks, views, soils and plants at the temples of ancient Greece". Antiquity. 82 (317): 640–657. doi:10.1017/s0003598x00097283. S2CID 15115738.
- Retallack, G. J. (2013). "Ediacaran life on land". Nature. 493 (7430): 89–92. Bibcode:2013Natur.493...89R. doi:10.1038/nature11777. PMID 23235827. S2CID 205232092.
- Retallack, G.J., 2025. Divine soil: grounds for worship. Cambridge Scholars, Edinburgh, 103 p ISBN 978-1-0364-4713-7
  - Retallack, G.J., 2025. Paleopoems. American Publshers, Los Angeles, 137 p ISBN 978-1-966840-22-0
