= Paleopedological record =

The paleopedological record is, essentially, the fossil record of soils. The paleopedological record consists chiefly of paleosols buried by flood sediments, or preserved at geological unconformities, especially plateau escarpments or sides of river valleys. Other fossil soils occur in areas where volcanic activity has covered the ancient soils.

== Problems of recognition ==
After burial, soil fossils tend to be altered by various chemical and physical processes. These include:

- Decomposition of organic matter that was once present in the old soil. This hinders the recognition of vegetation that was in the soil when it was present.
- Oxidation of iron from Fe^{2+} to Fe^{3+} by O_{2} as the former soil becomes dry and more oxygen enters the soil.
- Drying out of hydrous ferric oxides to anhydrous oxides - again due to the presence of more available O_{2} in the dry environment.

The keys to recognising fossils of various soils include:

- Tubular structures that branch and thin irregularly downward or show the anatomy of fossilised root traces
- Gradational alteration down from a sharp lithological contact like that between land surface and soil horizons
- Complex patterns of cracks and mineral replacements like those of soil clods (peds) and planar cutans.

== Classification ==
Soil fossils are usually classified by USDA soil taxonomy. With the exception of some exceedingly old soils which have a clayey, grey-green horizon that is quite unlike any present soil and clearly formed in the absence of O_{2}, most fossil soils can be classified into one of the twelve orders recognised by this system. This is usually done by means of X-ray diffraction, which allows the various particles within the former soils to be analysed so that it can be seen to which order the soils correspond.

Other methods for classifying soil fossils rely on geochemical analysis of the soil material, which allows the minerals in the soil to be identified. This is only useful where large amounts of the ancient soil are available, which is rarely the case.

== Records of the various soil groups ==
During the Precambrian, when life on land was precluded by a very thin or nonexistent ozone layer, soils were subject to much more rapid erosion and most fossils from this period are of undeveloped entisols or inceptisols. Vertisols and aridisols have a continuous fossil record from Paleoproterozoic continents onwards (though little is known about when they were first vegetated), whilst a few andisol fossils are known from the Mesoproterozoic and more abundantly from the Ordovician just before land vegetation began to emerge. Other major andisol fossils can be found in the middle Jurassic of Siberia.

Oxisols, deeply weathered tropical soils, have a rich fossil record from the Paleoproterozoic onwards. Outside of ice ages, oxisols have generally been the dominant soil order in the paleopedological record. This is because soil formation, after which oxisols take more weathering to form than any other soil order, has been almost non-existent outside eras of extensive continental glaciation. This is not only because of the soils formed by glaciation itself, but also because mountain building, which is the other critical factor in producing new soil, has always coincided with a reduction in global temperatures and sea levels. This is because the sediment formed from the eroding mountains reduces the atmospheric CO_{2} content and also causes changes in circulation linked closely by climatologists to the development of continental ice sheets. Oxisols were not vegetated until the late Carboniferous, probably because microbial evolution was not before that point advanced enough to permit plants to obtain sufficient nutrients from soils with very low concentrations of nitrogen, phosphorus, calcium and potassium.

Owing to their extreme climatic requirements, gelisol fossils are confined to the few periods of extensive continental glaciation - the earliest being 900 million years ago in the Neoproterozoic. However, in these periods fossil gelisols are generally abundant, notable finds coming from the Carboniferous in New South Wales.

The earliest land vegetation is found in Early Silurian entisols and inceptisols, and with the growth of land vegetation under a protective ozone layer several new soil orders emerged. The first, histosols, emerged in the Devonian but are rare as fossils because most of their mass consists of organic materials that tend to decay quickly. Alfisols and ultisols emerged in the late Devonian and early Carboniferous, and have a continuous, though not rich, fossil record in eras since then. Spodosols are known only from the Carboniferous and from a few periods since that time - though less acidic soils otherwise similar to spodosols are known from the Mesozoic and Tertiary and may constitute an extinct suborder.

During the Mesozoic the paleopedological record tends to be poor, probably because the absence of mountain-building and glaciation meant that most surface soils were very old and were constantly being weathered of what weatherable materials remained. Oxisols and orthents are the dominant groups, though a few more fertile soils have been found, such as the extensive andisols mentioned earlier from Jurassic Siberia. Evidence for widespread deeply weathered soils in the Paleocene can be seen in abundant oxisols and ultisols in now-heavily glaciated Scotland and Antarctica. Mollisols, the major agricultural soils of the present, are unique in their geological youth, being known from the Eocene but common only from the Miocene, as grasslands evolved. The most abundant paleopedological record is that of the Quaternary with few soils different from types widely found today.

An important difference between the paleopedological record and the fossil record of plants and animals is that very few of the soils found are extinct types. Despite the difficulties of identification mentioned earlier, this makes paleopedology (the study of fossil soils) potentially very useful for understanding the ecological relationships in past ecosystems.
