= John Catt =

British geologist and soil scientist

- Born: 1939
- Died: 7 December 2017 (aged 77–78)
- Awards: 1875 Award, Hertfordshire Natural History Society (2013); Distinguished Service Award, Geological Society (2015)

Academic background
- Education: University of Hull (BSc, PhD)

Academic work
- Discipline: Geology; Soil science
- Sub-discipline: Quaternary geology; Paleopedology; Soil management
- Institutions: Rothamsted Experimental Station (1963–1999); University College London (1999–2017)
- Notable works: Hertfordshire Geology and Landscape (2010)

John Catt (1939 – 7 December 2017) was a British geologist and soil scientist.

Catt spent most of his research career at the Rothamsted Experimental Station, where he made major contributions Quaternary paleopedology and soil management. After retiring from Rothamsted, he was appointed an honorary professor at University College London, and worked on Hertfordshire Geology and Landscape (2010), which was acclaimed as a definitive text on the natural history of Hertfordshire.

He received lifetime achievement awards from the Geological Society (2015) and the Hertfordshire Natural History Society (2013).

== Research career ==
Born in 1939, Catt studied geology at the University of Hull. He worked at the Rothamsted Experimental Station as a soil scientist from 1963 to 1999, serving as head of the soils department and deputy head of the institution. Upon his retirement, was appointed an honorary professor of geography at University College London. He was also a visiting professor at Birkbeck College, an honorary professor of the Czech University of Agriculture in Prague, and fellow of the Geological Society and Institute of Geology. He received the 2015 Distinguished Service Award from the Geological Society.

The initial focus of Catt's research at Rothamsted was on the pedogenesis of Quaternary soils, an extension of his PhD research at Hull. His Soils and Quaternary Geology: a handbook for field scientists (1986) intended to provide a "complete guide" to Quaternary sediments for non-Quaternary geologists, although reviewers did not agree that it met this aim, and were particularly critical of its limited geographical scope. In the 1990s, Catt worked on the problem of nomenclature in Quaternary paleopedology, publishing a Paleopedology manual (1990) and chairing a working group on definitions for the IUSS' Paleopedology Commission.

Later in his career, Catt turned his attention to soil management, researching crop performance, soil erosion and pollution by agricultural pesticides using remote sensing techniques. He collaborated with Michael Fullen on a textbook, Soil Management: Problems and Solutions (2004), and co-authored widely cited papers with John Quinton on the removal of phosphorus from soils and heavy metal pollution.

== Hertfordshire natural history ==
Catt was also an active member of the Hertfordshire Natural History Society, and received the society's '1875 Award for an outstanding contributor to natural history in Hertfordshire' in 2013. In 1973, he took over editorship of a volume on the geology of the county, which the society had been planning since 1950. The book was finally published in 2010 as Hertfordshire Geology and Landscape. A reviewer for Geoscientist praised it as "the most important book ever written on Hertfordshire's earth heritage" and "a testament to John Catt’s editorial and writing skills as well as his deep personal knowledge."

== Selected publications ==
- Quinton, John N.; Catt, John A. (2007). "Enrichment of Heavy Metals in Sediment Resulting from Soil Erosion on Agricultural Fields". Environmental Science & Technology. 41 (10): 3495–3500. Bibcode:2007EnST...41.3495Q. doi:10.1021/es062147h. ISSN 0013-936X. PMID 17547169.
- Fullen, Michael A.; Catt, John A. (2004). Soil Management: Problems and Solutions. London: Hodder Arnold. ISBN 978-0340807118. OCLC 56456707.
- Quinton, John N.; Catt, John A.; Hess, Tim M. (2001). "The Selective Removal of Phosphorus from Soil". Journal of Environmental Quality. 30 (2): 538–545. doi:10.2134/jeq2001.302538x. ISSN 1537-2537. PMID 11285915.
- Catt, John A. (1998). "Report from working group on definitions used in paleopedology". Quaternary International. 51–52: 84. Bibcode:1998QuInt..51...84C. doi:10.1016/S1040-6182(98)90232-4. ISSN 1040-6182.
- Catt, John A. (1990). "Paleopedology Manual". Quaternary International. 6 (special issue).
- Catt, John A. (1986). Soils and Quaternary geology : a handbook for field scientists. Oxford: Oxford University Press. ISBN 978-0198545682. OCLC 20491725.
