= Palaeogeography =

Study of physical geography of past landscapes

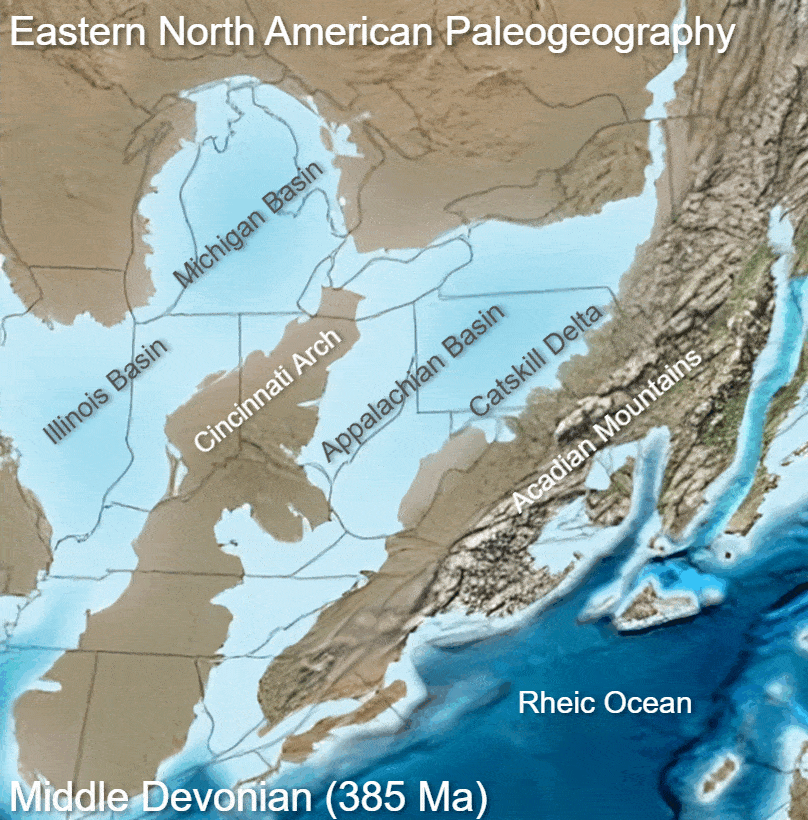
Paleogeographic reconstruction showing the Appalachian Basin area during the Middle Devonian period.

Palaeogeography (or paleogeography) is the study of historical geography, generally physical landscapes. Palaeogeography can also include the study of human or cultural environments. When the focus is specifically on landforms, the term paleogeomorphology is sometimes used instead. Paleomagnetism, paleobiogeography, and tectonic history are among its main tools.

Palaeogeography yields information that is crucial to scientific understanding in a variety of contexts. For example, palaeogeographical analysis of sedimentary basins plays a key role in the field of petroleum geology, because ancient geomorphological environments of the Earth's surface are preserved in the stratigraphic record. Palaeogeographers also study the sedimentary environment associated with fossils for clues to the evolutionary development of extinct species. Palaeogeography is furthermore crucial to the understanding of palaeoclimatology, due to the impact of the positions of continents and oceans on influencing global and regional climates.

Palaeogeographical evidence contributed to the development of continental drift theory, and continues to inform current plate tectonic theories, yielding information about the shape and latitudinal location of supercontinents such as Pangaea and ancient oceans such as Panthalassa, thus enabling reconstruction of prehistoric continents and oceans.

== See also ==
- Paleoclimatology – Study of changes in ancient climate
- Paleoceanography – Study of the oceans in the geologic past
- Paleocontinent – Major landmass in the geological past
- Paleoecology – Study of interactions between organisms and their environments across geologic timescales
- Paleogeography of the India–Asia collision system
- Paleohydrology – Study of hydrology over geological time
- Paleontology – Study of past life through fossils, often involving fossils and pollen (palynology).
- Paleopedology – Discipline studying soils of the past eras
- Paleosol – Soil buried under sediment or not representative of current environmental conditions
- Physical geography – Study of processes and patterns in the natural environment
- Plate tectonics – Movement of Earth's lithosphere
