= The Day the Earth Nearly Died =

- Genre: Documentary
- Country of origin: United Kingdom
- Original language: English

Production
- Executive producer: Matthew Barrett
- Producer: Nick Davidson
- Running time: 49 minutes

Original release
- Network: BBC Two
- Release: 5 December 2002

The Day the Earth Nearly Died is a British documentary produced by BBC to the science and philosophy series Horizon in 2002. The programme focuses on the mystery of the Permian extinction, which scientists believe killed over 90% of all life on earth at the end of the Permian, some 250 million years ago. The programme features scientists like Adrian Jones, Vincent Courtillot, Gregory Retallack, Peter Ward, Paul Wignall, Michael Benton, Michael R. Rampino and others.

== Synopsis ==
The programme features palaeontologists and other scientists as they try to find clues to the great extinction. In the programme, it is argued that the Permian extinction came in 3 stages; the first was caused by volcanic activity in the great Siberian Traps. This is proposed to have caused global warming, which in turn killed much of the life on land. Second, it warmed up the sea, which killed much of the marine life. As the sea became warmer, the ocean floor released a massive amount of methane. As the methane reached the atmosphere, the earth became even warmer, which led to the extinction of even more lifeforms on land. In the programme, the extinction is argued to have lasted less than 1 million years.
