= Astropedology =

Branch of soil science

Astropedology is the study of very ancient paleosols and meteorites relevant to the origin of life and different planetary soil systems. It is a branch of soil science (pedology) concerned with soils of the distant geologic past and of other planetary bodies to understand Earth's place in the universe. A geologic definition of soil is "a material at the surface of a planetary body modified in place by physical, chemical or biological processes". Soils are sometimes defined by biological activity but can also be defined as planetary surfaces altered in place by biologic, chemical, or physical processes. By this definition, the question for Martian soils and paleosols becomes, were they alive? Astropedology symposia are a new focus for scientific meetings on soil science.

Advancements in understanding the chemical and physical mechanisms of pedogenesis on other planetary bodies in part led the Soil Science Society of America (SSSA) in 2017 to update the definition of soil to: "The layer(s) of generally loose mineral and/or organic material that are affected by physical, chemical, and/or biological processes at or near the planetary surface and usually hold liquids, gases, and biota and support plants". Despite the meager understanding of extraterrestrial soils, their diversity may raise the question of how science might classify them, or formally compare them with Earth-based soils. One option is to simply use our present soil classification schemes, in which case many extraterrestrial soils would be Entisols in the United States Soil Taxonomy (ST) or Regosols in the World Reference Base for Soil Resources (WRB). However, applying an Earth-based system to such dissimilar settings is debatable. Another option is to distinguish the (largely) biotic Earth from the abiotic Solar System, and include all non-Earth soils in a new Order or Reference Group, which might be tentatively called Astrosols.

== Moon ==
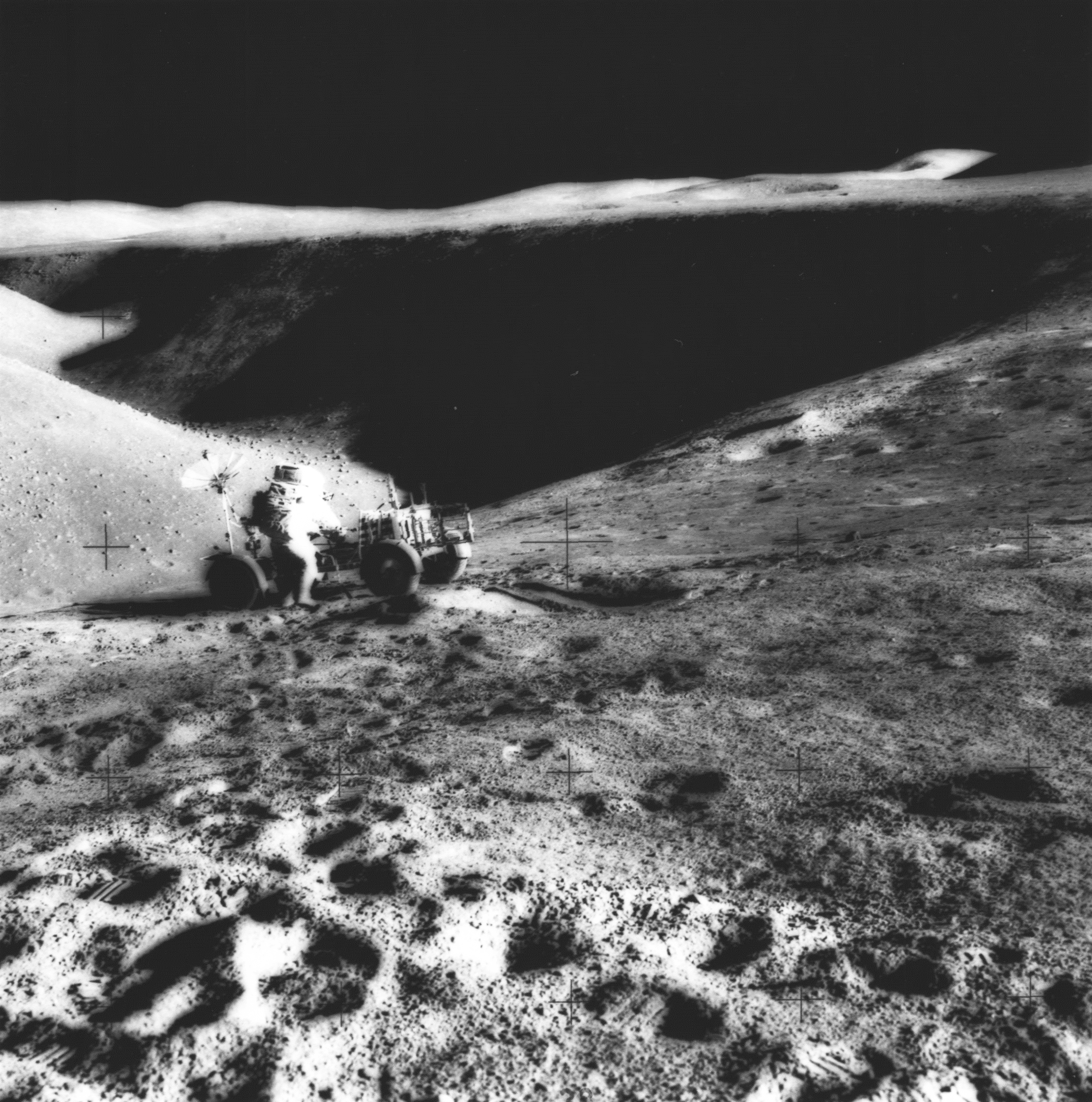
Lunar soil and footprints near Hadley Rille

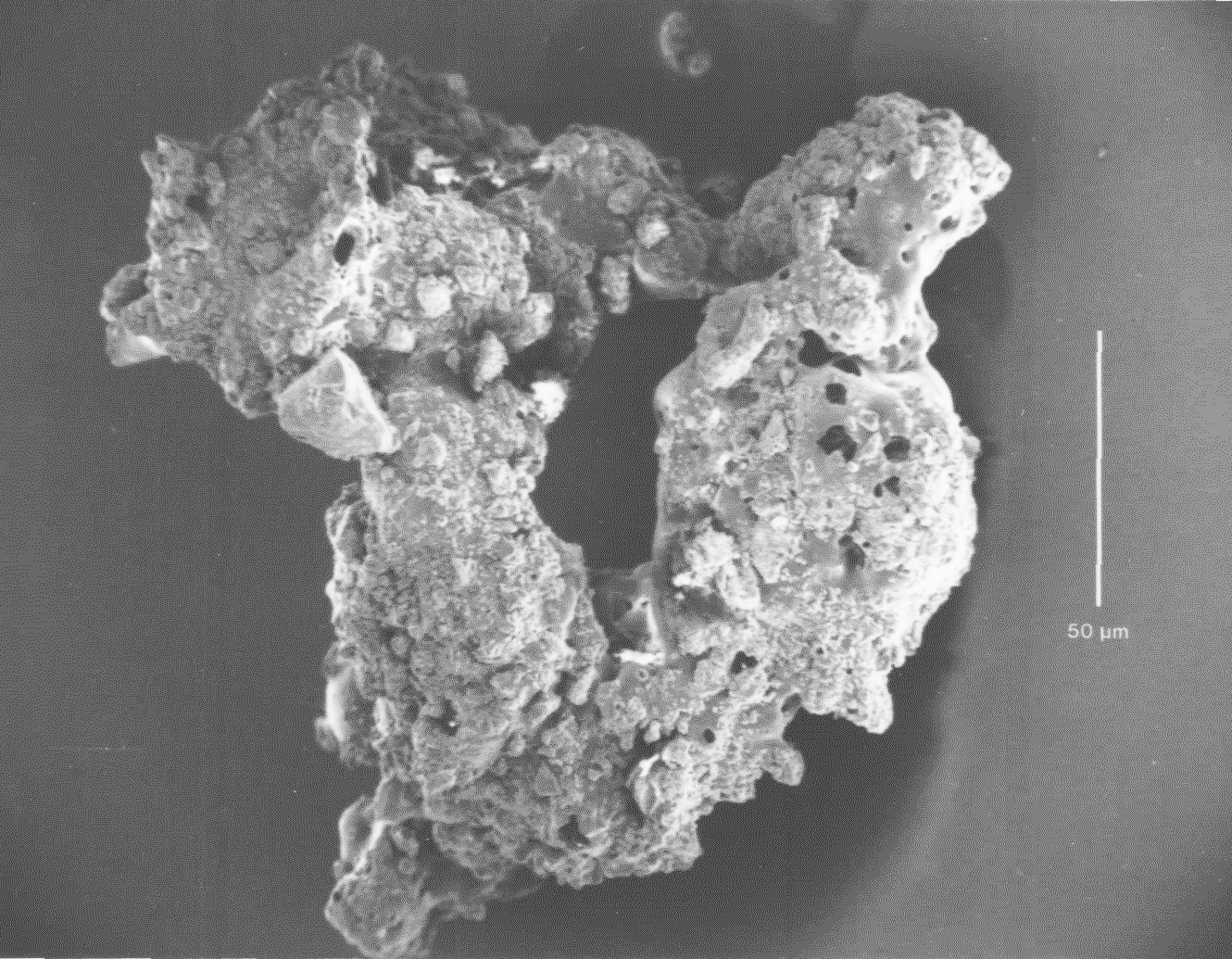
Lunar agglutinate

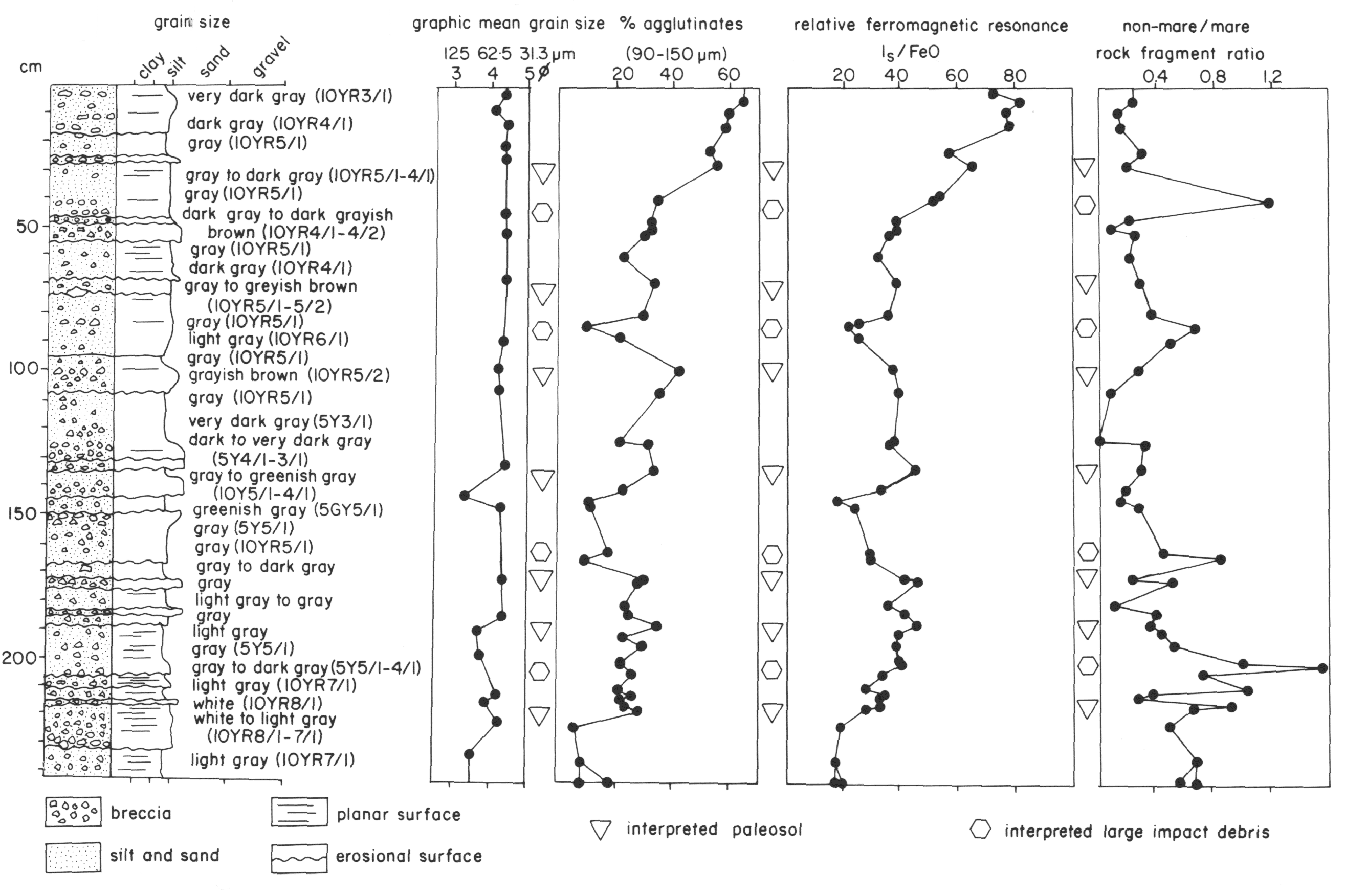
Measured section and composition of the Apollo 15 core on the Moon

=== Lunar paleosol composition ===
The surface of the Moon is covered with lunar regolith, a mixture of fine dust and rocky debris made by meteorite impacts, considered the soil of the Moon. Astronauts found few rock samples to pick up on mature regolith surfaces. The rocks had all been broken to fine soil by micrometeorite bombardment over the past billion years. The bulk of lunar regolith is a fine gray soil, breccia and rock fragments of the local bedrock. Continuous attacks by micrometeorites further disintegrate and melt soil particles. This melt, mixed with lithic fragments, forms irregular clusters called agglutinates. Lunar soil is fine-grained, unconsolidated material that is poorly sorted and has high porosity (41-70%) and relatively low density (0-9-1.1 g/cm^{3}) compared to its constituent particle density (2.9-3.2 g/cm^{3}). The rock fragments found in Lunar paleosol grains vary in size (ranging from silt-sized grains to boulder-sized grains) and include fragments of highland anorthosite and mare basalt from meteorite impacts. Lunar paleosols also contain mineral grains that make up the largest fraction of silt-sized grains (0.06-0.03 mm) in the soil since the crystals in lunar basalts are fine-grained. Paleosols found on the Moon contain many plagioclase and pyroxene minerals (ranging from a few to 40%). Olivine minerals are present but occur much more sporadically and rarely than these other minerals. Grains of ilmenite, spinel, metallic particles of kamacite and taenite, phosphide (schreibersite), and sulfide (troilite) have also been found in Lunar paleosols. However, they are also much less common than plagioclase and pyroxene. A third soil component found in Lunar paleosols, along with rock fragments and mineral grains, are glass particles, of which there are two main kinds: homogeneous glasses and agglutinates. Homogeneous glasses are variable in size (<2 μm-2 cm) and are typically found as dumbbell or teardrop-shaped glass particles. These particles are hypothesized to have formed as volcanic ash or melted rock that resulted from the heat released from meteoroid impacts. Agglutinates are inhomogeneous glass-bonded aggregates that are variable in size (<2 μm-1 mm) and are described as irregular masses of glass and crystals. These glass particles are cemented together by bridges of glassy cement between the minerals and rock fragments and are usually ring or bowl-shaped in appearance, much like a crater. Ring or bowl-shaped agglutinates form from the outward spreading of impact melt that cemented surrounding soil grains. Less common or distinct agglutinate shapes are known to form from the cementation of scattered drops of impact melt or parts of agglutinates that have broken from later impacts. Lunar paleosols closely resemble the parent material in chemical and physical composition. Although these paleosols form more physically than chemically, chemical processes on the Moon have formed thin (20-50 μm) amorphous rings in the soil resulting from the local cooling of vapor from meteoroid impacts. These impacts have created an enrichment of silica (Si) and sulfur (S) and depletion in magnesium (Mg), calcium (Ca), aluminum (Al), and titanium (Ti). Lunar exploration has found all essential minerals for growth of plants in sufficient quantities. Organic matter in the form of amino acids have been detected in lunar samples from the Apollo missions, but isotopic and molecular evidence of these compounds suggests terrestrial contamination as the source.

=== Lunar soil development ===
Some proposed mechanisms for Lunar paleosol formation include micrometeoroid bombardment, soil mixing resulting from charge-separation induced by solar energy, thermal fatigue or soil churning caused by changes in temperature, and soil wing sputtering. Larger scale impacts would affect soil formation on the Moon by interrupting this process by releasing ejecta blankets. Lunar soil formation is based on the degree of reworking by micrometeoroids, and there are several developmental stages of formation. The first stages consist of a coarse-grained and poorly-sorted blanket of impact ejecta. In the next stages, micrometeoroid bombardment breaks down the material to even finer grains, which increases the ratio of agglutinates. This micrometeoroid bombardment also adds meteoritic metal and reduces iron (Fe^2+) in silicates to metallic iron in the soil. Agglutinates and metal cause the soil to darken in color over a long period. The top of the lunar soil profile is highly enriched in agglutinates and ferromagnetic index, which is thought to reflect an increased redistribution caused by large impacts of micrometeoroid modified soil material through time. The time of formation of lunar paleosols is variable and can take up to hundreds of millions of years in some paleosols. The time for soil formation on the Moon has been calculated based on the influx rate of micrometeoroids of a size range capable of forming agglutinates. These calculations demonstrate that there are comparably much slower soil formation rates on the Moon than on Earth. Extrapolations for the time of soil formation have also been made based on crater production rates that suggest 81 thousand years (ka) for the time for overturning the upper 2 cm of Lunar soil.

== Mars ==
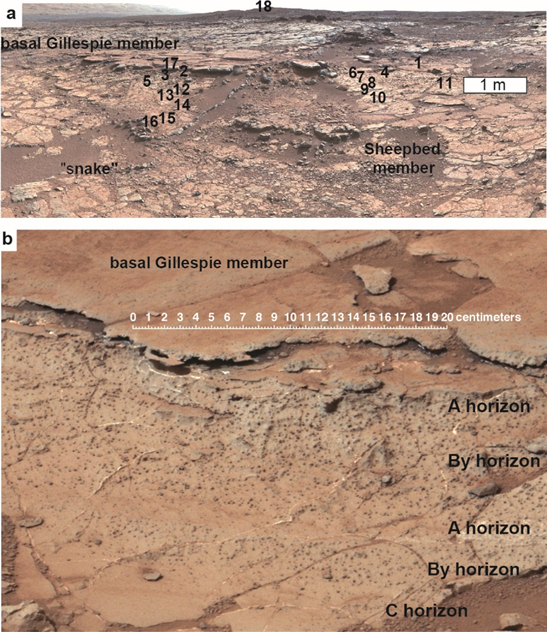
3.7 billion year old paleosols in Yellowknife Bay, Gale Crater, Mars, from Curiosity Rover

Evidence of paleosols on Mars is derived from both in-situ and orbital remote sensing investigations of the Martian surface. In-situ chemical / mineralogical analyses (Mars Science Laboratory) and images (Mastcam, MAHLI) from the Curiosity rover in Gale Crater on Mars have shown similarities with soil horizons and soil structures found on Earth. Morphological evidence includes soil features such as gradational alteration and bedding disruption by dilational cracks and veins, consistent with soluans of desert soils, blocky angular ped structures, sand wedges, a shallow gypsic (By) horizon, and vesicular structure. Structures like those found in Earth's desert soils caused by microbial gas production after rains (vesicular structure) have been recognized on Mars, but definitive evidence of life on Mars has yet to be obtained. Mineral abundances within the paleosols show olivine weathering to smectite and a modest depletion of phosphorus. Such hydrolytic weathering is comparable to weathering found on Earth. The chemical and morphological features of the Yellowknife Bay paleosols are a new line of evidence for late Noachian (3.7 ± 0.3 Ga) paleoclimate on Mars, and are interpreted as forming under a hyperarid frigid paleoclimate. Radiometric dating suggests the paleosols at Yellowknife Bay are 3.7 billion years old (± 0.3 billion years) and reveal a change from possible "warm and wet" conditions of the Early Noachian (~4.1-3.9 Ga) to an extreme arid and cold climate with limited soil formation.

Remote sensing of the Martian surface by the Mars Reconnaissance Orbiter (MRO)'s CRISM instrument and the Infrared Mineralogical Mapping Spectrometer (OMEGA) has detected the presence of dioctahedral and trioctahedral phyllosilicate clays in thousands of locations across the surface of the planet. Orbital characterization of Martian mineralogy is primarily derived from the visible/near-infrared (VNIR) spectra of rocks containing clay minerals. These areas include Gale Crater, Mawrth Vallis, Oxia Planum, and Nili Fossae, among others, and date to 4.0-3.7 Ga. There are two hypotheses to explain the formation and distribution of phyllosilicate clays on Mars: (1) subsurface and hydrothermal activity and/or diagenesis which yield trioctahedral phyllosilicates, and (2) surface / subaerial chemical weathering, e.g., pedogenesis which yield dioctahedral phyllosilicates. Importantly, some of these areas (Mawrth Vallis and Oxia Planum) have weathering profiles of Al-smectites overlain by Fe/ Mg smectites (all of which appear to be dioctahedral), and then poorly crystalline / amorphous phases like allophane and imogolite. These weathering profiles are capped by an igneous deposit of an estimated 3.7-3.6 Ga which may be a pyroclastic deposit or a mafic sandstone, similar to paleosols buried beneath igneous deposits on Earth. These stratigraphic profiles appear to be up to 200 m in thickness, with individual layers of 10 m in thickness or less. This stratigraphy reflects the possible cooling and drying of Noachean Mars, and may preserve organic matter or other biosignatures because of the exceptionally high clay content (~50 wt %) and clay mineralogy (2:1 smectites) of these buried rocks.

== Growing plants on the Moon and Mars ==
The soil on Mars has the required nutrients plants would need to survive. Oxygen, carbon, hydrogen, nitrogen, potassium, phosphorus, calcium, magnesium, sulfur, iron, manganese, zinc, copper, molybdenum, boron, and chlorine have all been detected on Martian soil or in Martian meteorites. Depending on the exact location, fertilizers may need to be added to the soil. Lunar and Mars explorations have provided information about the mineral composition of the soils on the Moon and Mars. All essential minerals for the growth of plants appear to be present in sufficient quantities in both soils probably with the exception of reactive nitrogen. Nitrogen in reactive form (NO3, NH4) is one of the essential minerals necessary for almost all plant growth. The major source of reactive nitrogen on Earth is the mineralization of organic matter. Nitrogen in reactive form (NO3, NH4) is one of the essential minerals necessary for almost all plant growth. Reactive nitrogen is part of the material in the Solar System and is part of solar wind, a source of reactive nitrogen on the Moon and Mars. Reactive nitrogen may also arise as an effect of lightning or volcanic activity and both processes may occur on Mars. This indicates that in principle reactive nitrogen could be present. However, the Mars Pathfinder was not able to detect reactive nitrogen. Thus the actual presence of major quantities of reactive nitrogen remains uncertain.

The absence of sufficient reactive nitrogen may be solved by using nitrogen fixing species. In symbioses with bacteria these nitrogen fixers are able to bind nitrogen from the air and transform it into nitrates, a process which requires nitrogen in the atmosphere. However, there is no atmosphere on the moon, and on Mars it is only minimally present and contains traces of nitrogen. There are published reports on the first large-scale controlled experiment to investigate the possibility of growing plants in Mars and Moon soil simulants. The results show that plants are able to germinate and grow on both Martian and moon soil simulant for a period of 50 days without any addition of nutrients. Growth and flowering on Mars regolith simulant was much better than on Moon regolith simulant and even slightly better than on our control nutrient poor river soil. Reflexed stonecrop (a wild plant); the crops tomato, wheat, and cress; and the green manure species field mustard performed particularly well. The latter three flowered, and cress and field mustard also produced seeds. The results showed that in principle it is possible to grow crops and other plant species in Martian and Lunar soil simulants. However, many questions remain about the simulants' water carrying capacity and other physical characteristics and also whether the simulants are representative of the real soils.

== Perchlorates ==
The presence of perchlorates in the soil makes growing vegetables on Mars especially difficult. Since there is no ozone layer on Mars, UV rays penetrate to the surface of the planet. Perchlorates become toxic when exposed to UV light, destroying bacteria within minutes of exposure. Research suggests that the iron oxides and hydrogen peroxide present in the soil on Mars increases the toxicity of perchlorates. The high level of perchlorates found on Mars (0.05 wt %) is concentrated enough that it would be toxic for humans and crops, and could be used for rocket fuel. Studies indicate that low concentrations of aqueous perchlorates inhibit the height, weight, chlorophyll content and oxidizing power of plants. One plant, E. crassipes, seems to have a high tolerance to perchlorates and might be an ideal plant for growing on Mars. Perchlorates can accumulate in the tissue of plants if grown in a contaminated medium. Since even trace amounts interfere with thyroid functions in humans, the presence of perchlorates in Martian soils is a significant issue that needs to be addressed before colonization occurs.

== Early Earth ==
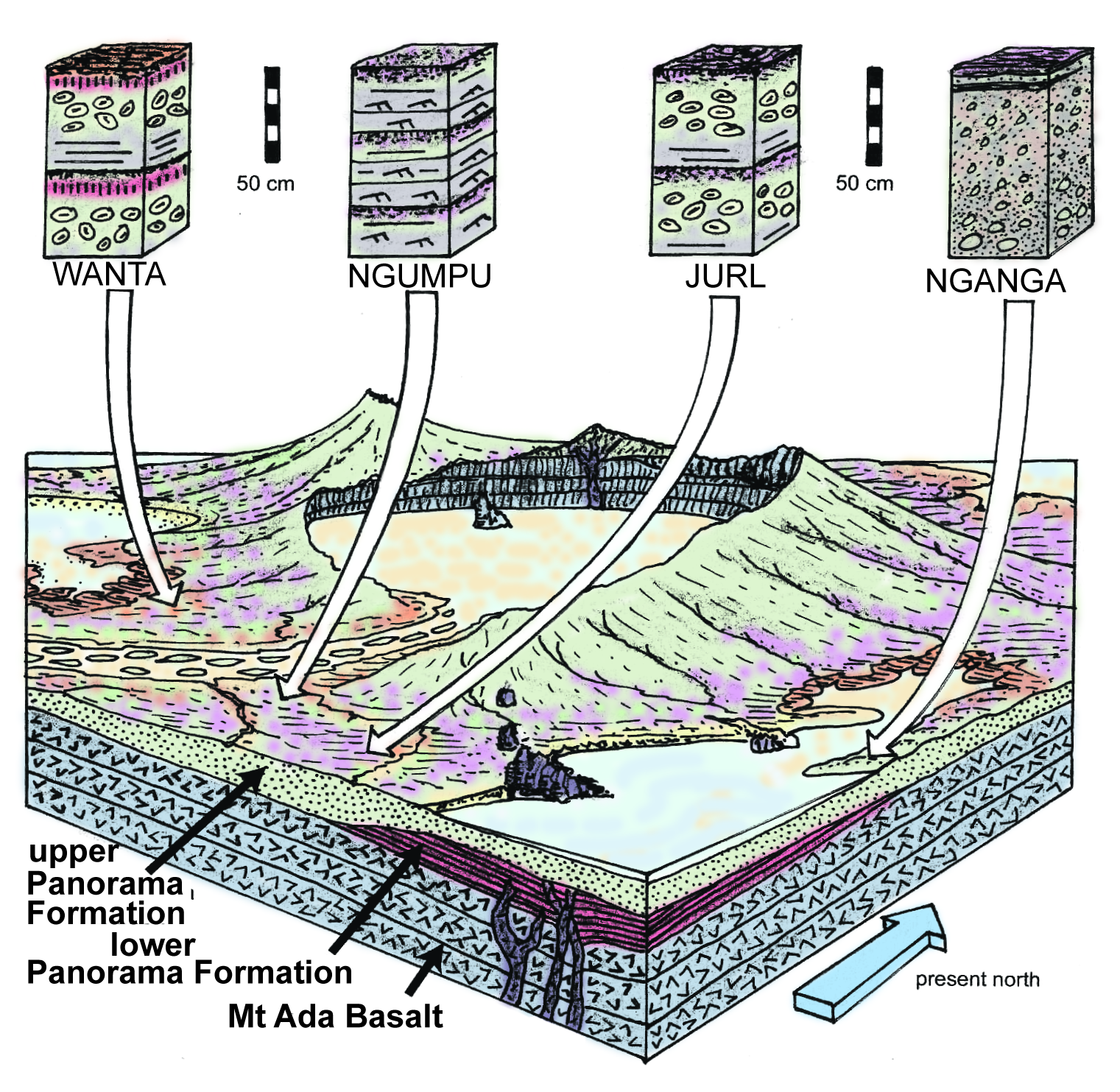
Reconstructed 3.5 billion year old paleosols from the Panorama Formation in the Pilbara region of Western Australia

Soil profiles from the Pilbara region of northwestern Australia show distinct depletion of phosphorus. A common metabolism for sulfur bacteria is oxidation to sulphates such as gypsum and barite. These minerals are common is anaerobic acid-sulphate soils found on Earth currently and are considered a potential reason for the accumulation of sulphate in Archaean paleosols. This reflects circumstantial evidence for life in paleosols on Earth during the Archean, 3.42 to 3.46 Ga [1].

== Origin of life ==
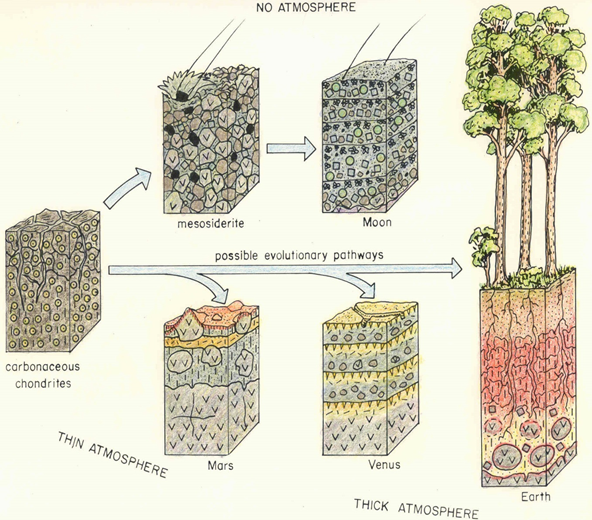
Hypothetical evolution of soil types on various meteorite parent bodies and planetary surfaces

The theory that life evolved in soil is appealing because soil traps water between the grains of clay, providing an array of microscopic reaction chambers. These may also promote formation of organic compounds by mechanisms demonstrated in the Urey-Miller experiment, so that planetary surfaces were covered with carbonaceous chondrite. Clayey and organic soils are protected from erosion and thus continued to produce clay and organic matter. Unicellular life, when it evolved, would also have served same purpose of binding the soil. The ingredients required for life are still provided by the weathering cycle, which promotes life.

== See also ==
- Astrobiology
- Planetary geology
- Martian soil
- Perchlorate
