= Paul Wignall =

British palaeontologist

Paul Barry Wignall
- Born: 1964 (age 61–62); Bradford, England

Academic background
- Education: University of Oxford (BA), University of Birmingham (PhD)

Academic work
- Discipline: Palaeontology, Sedimentology
- Institutions: University of Leeds

Paul Barry Wignall is a British palaeontologist and sedimentologist. He is best known for his research on mass extinctions in the marine realm., particularly via the interpretation of black shales.

== Biography ==
Wignall obtained an undergraduate degree in geology from Worcester College at the University of Oxford in 1985. He then completed a PhD in Palaeoecology at the University of Birmingham in 1988, supervised by Anthony Hallam. He spent a year as a postdoctoral researcher with John Hudson at the University of Leicester before gaining employment in the School of Earth and Environment at the University of Leeds in 1989, where he is currently Professor of Palaeoenvironments.

== Research ==
Wignall is well known for his research on extinction in the fossil record, particularly the Permian-Triassic mass extinction. He has published extensively on the importance of oceanic anoxia and high temperatures as kill mechanisms during this event. He also has an interest in understanding the coincidence of supercontinents, large igneous provinces and mass extinction events in Earth history.

== Publications ==
Wignall has published over 200 research articles and books, including Mass Extinctions and Their Aftermath, The Worst of Times: How Life on Earth Survived Eighty Million Years of Extinctions and Extinction: A Very Short Introduction.

== Media ==
Wignall has featured in several television programs, including BBC Horizon episode The Day the Earth Nearly Died.

== Awards ==
- 1988 Cecil Barber Prize (best PhD thesis in Earth Sciences), University of Birmingham
- 1988 Fearnsides Prize, Yorkshire Geological Society
- 1991 President's Award, Geological Society of London
- 1996-97 Clough Memorial Award, Edinburgh Geological Society
- 2005 James Lee Wilson Award, Society for Sedimentary Geology
- 2005-2006 Kan Tong Po Visiting professor at University of Hong Kong, awarded by Royal Society
- 2017 Jean Baptiste Lamarck Medal, European Geosciences Union
- Royal Society Wolfson Research Merit Award

== Other ==
Wignall co-founded the Craven and Pendle Geological Society in 1990. He was President of the Leeds Geological Association in 2007–2008, and President of the Yorkshire Geological Society in 2009–2010. He was also a member of the Research Excellence Framework review panel for Earth Sciences in 2014.

== See also ==
Paul Wignall's profile at University of Leeds: https://environment.leeds.ac.uk/see/staff/1607/professor-paul-wignall
