= Cutans =

Cutans are the modification of the soil texture, or soil structure, at natural surfaces (particle, pore, or ped) in soil materials due to illuviation. Cutans are oriented deposits which can be composed of any of the component substances of the soil material. Cutans are common features in soil and represent focuses of chemical and biological reactions. Cutans may include clay skins or coatings of silica, sesquioxide, manganese, ferromanganese, soil organic matter or carbonate. Clay skins are also called argillans, and soil horizons with sufficient clay illuviation are termed argillic horizons.

== Significance ==
Cutans provide physical evidence, observable in the field, as to the degree and nature of pedogenesis. The ability to assess cutans is a core skill in soil morphology and paleopedology.

== See also ==
- Alfisols
- Soil profile
