= Paleopedology =

Discipline studying soils of the past eras

Paleopedology (palaeopedology in the United Kingdom) is the discipline that studies soils of past geological eras, from quite recent (Quaternary) to the earliest periods of the Earth's history. Paleopedology can be seen either as a branch of soil science (pedology) or of paleontology, since the methods it uses are in many ways a well-defined combination of the two disciplines.

== History ==
Paleopedology's earliest developments arose from observations in Scotland circa 1795 whereby it was found that some soils in cliffs appeared to be remains of a former exposed land surface. During the 19th century there were many other finds of former soils throughout Europe and North America. However, most of this was only found in the search for animal and/or plant fossils, and it was not until soil science first developed that buried soils of past geological ages were considered of any value.

It was only when the first relationships between soils and climate were observed in the Eurasian Steppe that there was any interest in applying the finds of former soils to past ecosystems. This occurred because, by the 1920s, some soils in Russia had been found by K.D. Glinka that did not fit with present climates and were seen as relics of warmer climates in the past.

In 1892 Eugene W. Hilgard had related soil and climate in the United States in the same manner, and by the 1950s analysis of Quaternary stratigraphy to monitor recent environmental changes in the northern hemisphere had become firmly established. These developments have allowed soil fossils to be classified according to USDA soil taxonomy quite easily with all recent soils. Interest in earlier soil fossils was much slower to grow but has steadily developed since the 1960s owing to the development of such techniques as X-ray diffraction which permit their classification. This has allowed many developments in paleoecology and paleogeography to take place because soil chemistry can provide a good deal of evidence as to how life moved onto land during the Paleozoic era.

== Finding soil fossils and their structure ==
Remains of former soils can either be found under deposited sediment in unglaciated areas or in extremely steep cliffs where the old soil can be seen below the younger present-day soil. In cases where volcanoes have been active, some soil fossils occur under the volcanic ash. If there is continued deposition of sediment, a sequence of soil fossils will form, especially after the retreat of glaciers during the Holocene. Soil fossils can also exist where a younger soil has been eroded (for instance by wind), as in the Badlands of South Dakota. (One must exclude areas where present-day soils are relics of former wetter climates, as with Australia and southern Africa. The soils of these regions are proper paleosols.)

Soil fossils, whether buried or exposed, suffer from alteration. This occurs largely because almost all past soils have lost their former vegetative covering, and the organic matter they once supported has been used up by plants since the soil was buried. However, if remains of plants can be found, the nature of the soil fossil can be made a great deal clearer than if no flora can be found because roots can nowadays be identified with respect to the plant group from which they come. Patterns of root traces including their shape and size, is good evidence for the vegetation type the former soil supported. Bluish colours in the soil tend to indicate the plants have mobilized nutrients within the soil.

The horizons of fossil soils typically are sharply defined only in the top layers, unless some of the parent material has not been obliterated by soil formation. The kinds of horizons in fossil soils are generally the same as those found in present-day soils, allowing easy classification in modern taxonomy of all but the oldest soils.

== Analysis ==
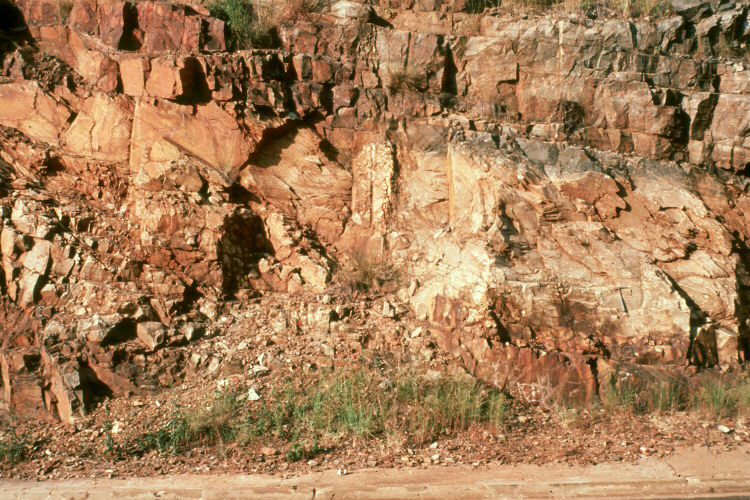
Vertisol paleosol Watervol Onder

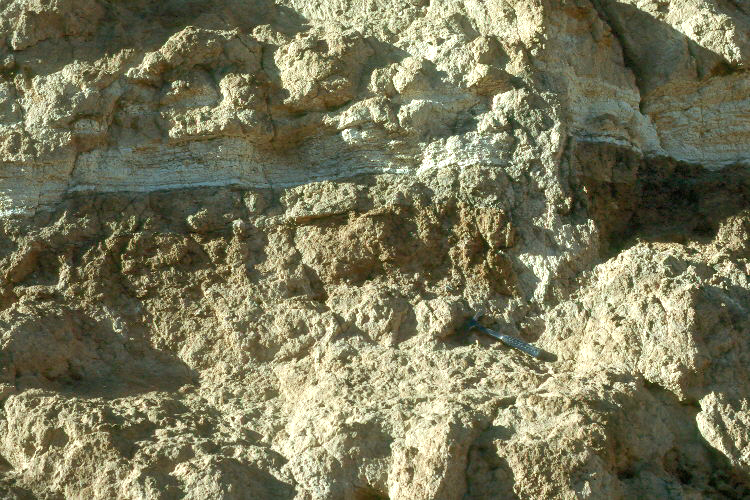
Mollisol in Dayville, Oregon

Chemical analysis of soil fossils generally focuses on their lime content, which determines both their pH and how reactive they will be to dilute acids. Chemical analysis is also useful, usually through solvent extraction to determine key minerals. This analysis can be of some use in determining the structure of a soil fossil, but today X-ray diffraction is preferred because it permits the crystal structure of the former soil to be determined.

With the aid of X-ray diffraction, paleosols can now be classified into one of the 12 orders of soil taxonomy (Oxisols, Ultisols, Alfisols, Mollisols, Spodosols, Aridisols, Entisols, Inceptisols, Gelisols, Histosols, Vertisols and Andisols). Many Precambrian soils, however, when examined do not fit the characteristics for any of these soil orders and have been placed in an order called green clays. The green colour is due to the presence of certain unoxidised minerals found in the primitive Earth because O_{2} was not present. There are also some forest soils of more recent times that cannot clearly be classified as alfisols or as spodosols because, despite their sandy horizons, they are not nearly acidic enough to have the typical features of a spodosol.

== Importance ==
Paleopedology is an important scientific discipline for the understanding of the ecology and evolution of ancient ecosystems, both on Earth and the emerging field of exoplanet research, or astropedology. In geochemistry, a knowledge of the structure of former soils is also valuable to understand the composition of paleo continents.

=== Models ===
The different definitions applied to soils are indicative of the different approaches taken to them. Where farmers and engineers concentrate on certain soil properties, soil scientists have a different view. Essentially, these differing views of the definition of soil are different theoretical bases for their study. Soils can be thought of as open systems in that they represent a boundary between the Earth and the atmosphere where materials are transported and are changed. There are four basic types of flux: additions, subtractions, transfers, and transformations. Examples of addition can include mineral grains and leaf litter, while subtractions can include surficial erosion of minerals and of organic matter. Transfers include the movement of a material within a soil profile, and transformations are the change of composition and form of the materials within a soil.

Soils can also be considered to be energy transformers in that they are physical structures of material that are modified by naturally occurring processes. The Sun constitutes the primary energy source for soils and significantly outweighs any heat generated by radioactive decay flowing up from deep within the Earth's crust. The deposition of sediment, or the addition of groundwater or rain, can also be considered an energy gain because new minerals and water can alter preexisting materials within the soil. These processes, coupled with the amount of energy available to fuel them, are what create a soil profile.

Another way to view soils is that they are environmental products that are molded over a period of time from the materials available to them. The large amount of influences that effect the formation of soils can be simplified to five main factors: climate, organisms, topographic relief, parent material, and time. These five factors can be easily remembered using the acronym "CLORPT". These categories are useful for mentally considering that aspects that occurred during the formation of a soil or paleosol. More importantly however, CLORPT allows for a theoretical framework when creating natural experiments for the study of soil formation.

=== Climate ===
When soil science was first founded, climate was considered one of the most important factors regarding the formation of soil. For instance, temperate regions have widespread acidic sand spodosols, and in tropical regions red clayey oxisols are common. The tendency to use climatic data for the classification of soils has been challenged by efforts to base the classification of soil on observable features within the soils. However, paleoclimates cannot be interpreted from paleosols identified using paleoclimatic data. The identification of paleosols using climatic data is changing. For example, aridisols have been redefined as soils that possess a calcic horizon of less than 1 meter in depth.

Soil climate is also a special kind of microclimate. It refers to the moisture, temperature, and other climatic indicators that are found within the pores of soil. For example, in well-drained soils, the soil climate is a somewhat subdued version of the regional climate. In waterlogged soils, soil climate is not related to regional climate because the temperature and oxygenation of waterlogged soils is more dependent on local groundwater paths and rates than on atmospheric conditions. Estimates of other types of soil climate are now beginning to find their way into the classification of soils, the models for soil formation, and into the study of soil biology.

The classification of climate from paleosols can be related using climatically sensitive features of soils that are sensitive to particular climatic variables, but even the best of these features lack precision. This is because soils are not as sensitive as meteorological instruments for recording climatic conditions. However, in a fairly broad category, climate can be interpreted from the sensitive features found in soils. One of the most large-scale influences regarding the classification of climate was created in 1918, then modified over two decades by the German meteorologist Vladimir Köppen. He proposed there are five main climate groups (Köppen climate classification), each corresponding to the main types of terrestrial vegetation. Each climate type is designated by letters, with upper-case letters referring to the main climate groups and lower-case letters referring to subsidiary climatic features.

=== Organisms ===
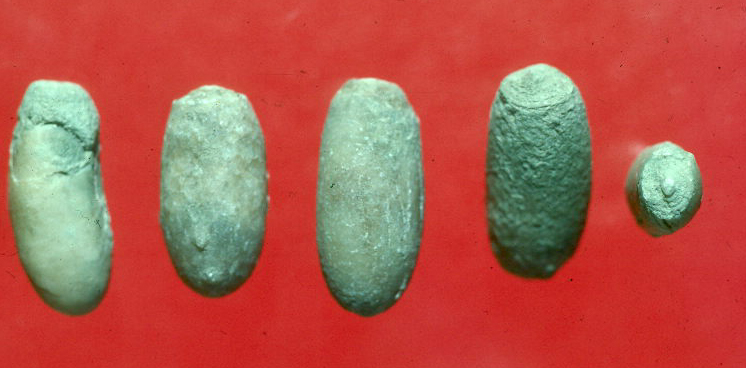
Bee nest ichnofossils from Wyoming

Large plants are only part of the organisms that play a role in soil formation. For example, fungi are closely associated with the roots of many vascular plants by making available nutrients like nitrogen and phosphorus in a way that their host plants can utilize, and play an important role in returning organic matter to the soil by decomposing leaf litter. The list of organisms that interact with and affect soil is extensive, and it is these interactions that allow for the presence of paleosols to be inferred.

Not only can particular organisms be interpreted from paleosols, but also ancient ecosystems. The soil interaction of plants is different from community to community. They each have distinct patterns of root traces, soil structure, and overall profile form. Identifying these features is useful for providing an overall assessment of the influence past organisms had on any particular paleosol. However, qualifying these general effects of organism activity can be difficult because the level of their expression is as related to their nature as it is to the amount of time available for soil formation. Even when fossils that are found in paleosols are understood, much more can be learned regarding their preservation, ecology, and evolution by studying the paleosols they inhabited.

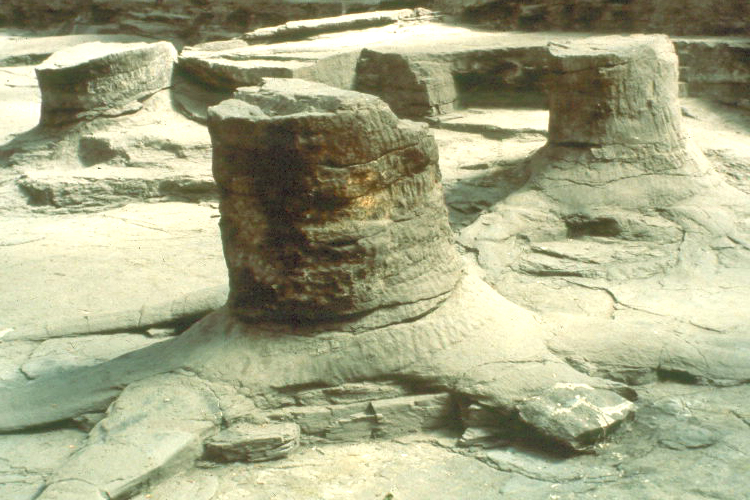
Fossil stumps in a paleosol

A fossilized footprint, burrow, or coprolite (fossil feces), are examples of trace fossils (ichnofossils). These trace fossils do not represent any physical part of an organism, but rather are evidence of an organism's activity within its environment. Whereas a bone, leaf, or stem might provide enough information to positively identify a particular species, trace fossils rarely allow for such a precise identification. However, unlike fossilized body parts which can be affected by many variables, trace fossils are not often transported away and are usually found in the place where the organism lived. This advantage makes trace fossils in paleosols especially important because they allow for interpretation of the animal's behavior in its natural environment. A great example of this is the simple shallow fossilized burrows of solitary bees that make their homes in soil.

Just as fossilized footprints, burrows, and coprolites represent trace fossils or organisms, paleosols can be considered trace fossils of an ancient ecosystem. Much like the small percentage of species that are fossilized, very few species within an ecosystem leave any discernible trace in paleosols. However, their more general effects within a paleosol may be preserved. A good example of this is root traces. Analyzing the pattern of root traces, the sequence of soil horizons, and other features can help identify the type of vegetation that was present during the formation of the soil.

General features such as stature and spacing determine what botanists call a "plant formation." Distinct from a community or association, plant formation is not defined by any particular species. Examples of plant formation include forests, woodlands, and grasslands. Because it may not be possible to determine whether a particular plant was an oak, eucalyptus, or other species, plant formations in paleosols make it possible to identify an ancient woodland ecosystem from an ancient grassland ecosystem.

=== Topographic relief ===
The nature of soils will vary with topography, which can be understood by comparing the thin rocky soils of mountain tops to the thick fertile soils of grass-covered lowlands. Even in a featureless lowland, the nature of a soil will vary greatly depending on whether or not it is well drained; although the drainage of soil is not completely independent because vegetation, microclimate, and the age of the land surfaces will vary within a given landscape. However, in smaller areas, the limiting factors may be so extensive that a variation in soils across a landscape will constitute a true topographical sequence, and the features within these soils can yield reliable topographic functions.

Bold landscapes like alpine ridges and peaks can be resolved based on distinct slope-related processes. For example, steep alpine slopes have sparse vegetation with soils that are eroded by snow melt, agitated by frost heave, and impacted by rock fall. These processes create thin, shallowly rooted, lightly weathered and rocky soils that are indicative of a mountain slope environment. The size and degree of these processes do not allow for strict analysis as topographic functions because of the extensive variation in climate, vegetation, parent materials, and land surface age at different elevations on a mountainside.

=== Parent material ===
The rock or sediment associated with a soil's development is referred to as its parent material, which is the starting point for the process of soil formation. During early formation, soils are not so different from their parent materials. With time however, soils will contain less features of their original parent material. In order to make an accurate assessment of the amount of soil formation that has occurred, the parent material must be known to establish a base line, or starting point in the soil's formation.

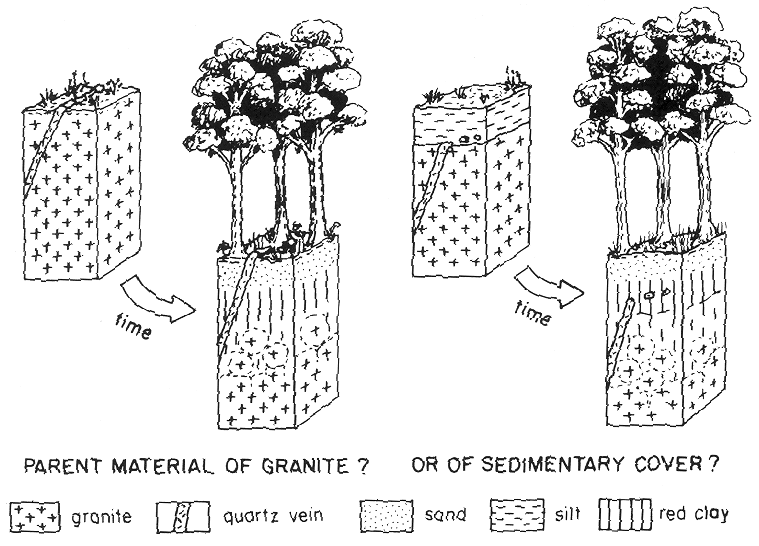
Igneous parent material

In most instances, parent material is independent of soil formation. The formation of igneous rocks and metamorphic rocks occurs in locations and by processes below the surface of the Earth. These rocks are often the parent material for soils and are sometimes derived from soils, but the degree of sedimentary sorting and distribution varies so widely that these are also considered to be independent of soils.

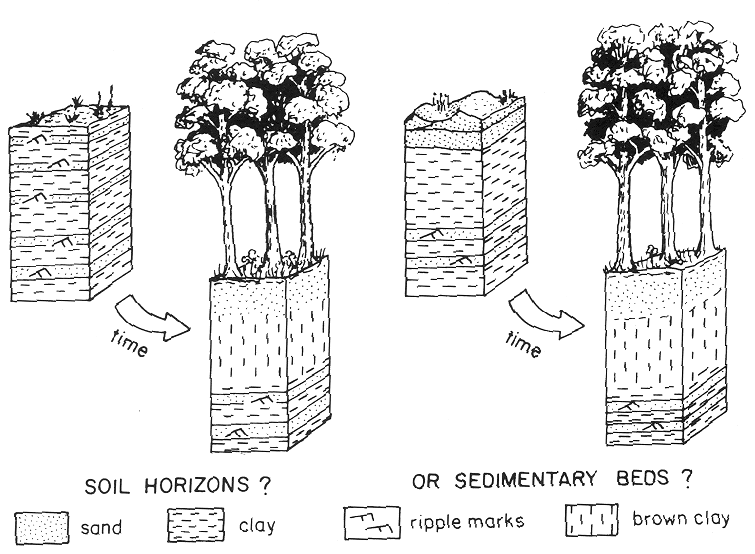
Sedimentary parent material

Very few parent materials associated with soils are entirely uniform in their composition or structure. Frequently, there is some degree of irregularity including foliation, veining, jointing, or layering that in some cases helps with soil formation and in other cases hampers it. For example, some sedimentary layering promotes the formation of soil such as a silty cover on bedrock, or a sandy cover on a clayey alluvium layer. In both of these cases, a friable surface material has been established by nonpedogenic instances. Other instances of sedimentary surface cementation, or fine interbedded sequences of clay and sand, could be considered to be not conducive to the formation of a soil. Nonuniform parent materials may be difficult to find in soils and paleosols, although deviations from normally found minerals could lend clues to the original parent material. If grains of primary materials are not found in the parent material, it can be inferred that later additions occurred. For example, quartz is not found in basaltic phonolite, and olivine is not found in granite.

The role of parent material is best understood from studies of soils that formed under similar conditions on different parent materials or lithosequences (differing soil profile characteristics because of differing parent materials). This provides a starting point for understanding what role the parent material played during the formation of the soil. The generalized relationships obtained from these studies can be used to determine what effects the parent material had on the paleosol during its formation. The difficulty lies with the fact that the parent material no longer exists, and therefore its nature can only be estimated using nearby materials.

These estimates are typically based on four critical assumptions that should be recognized as assumptions and thus assessed cautiously when evaluating soils and paleosols. These four simplifying assumptions allow for a detailed analysis of the changes that occur during the formation of a soil and the burial of a soil.

1. The first assumption is that the parent material is fresh. This means that the parent material assumed to be a proxy for the original parent material must be both chemically and physically similar to that original material. For example, saprolite cannot be considered to be an accurate representation of a parent material derived from a forested soil on granite, but it could be representative of a cultivated soil formed after a clear-cut and erosion of a forested soil.
2. The second assumption is that the parent material had a uniform composition within the soil profile. If the properties of the material found below the profile are to be considered representative of the parent material of the entire profile, this must be true. However, this is difficult considering that few rocks or sediments are uniform enough to be considered an accurate representation of the original parent material. For example, it is extremely difficult to detect a thin layer of windblown dust on top of granite within a thick clayey soil.
3. The third assumption is that at least one of the constituents of the parent material is unaltered by weathering and is still present. The main problem with this is that no constituents are fully immune to the broad weathering processes that exist in nature. For example, quartz is a fairly stable mineral in soils with pH>9, while alumina (Al_{2}O_{3}) is stable in between pH 4.5 and 8 (mostly in clay). Trace elements that are usually stable in soils over a wider range of environmental conditions include lead (Pb) and zirconium (Zr) but are not always sufficiently present to be useful.
4. The fourth assumption is that volume change is proportional to thickness and density. This states that the loss of soil volume and the degree of compaction during burial are related to their density or thickness change. Although common sense suggests that volume and density are three dimensional and thickness is one dimensional, observations on various materials, including fossil plants of known shape show that while under conditions of static vertical load, soils and fossils are maintained by pressure at the side.

== See also ==
- Cutans
- Paleosols
