= Paleosol =

Soil buried under sediment or not representative of current environmental conditions

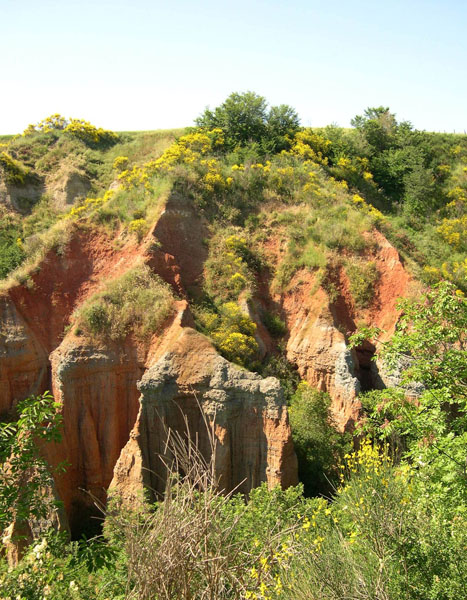
Paleosols sequence, Tuscany, Italy

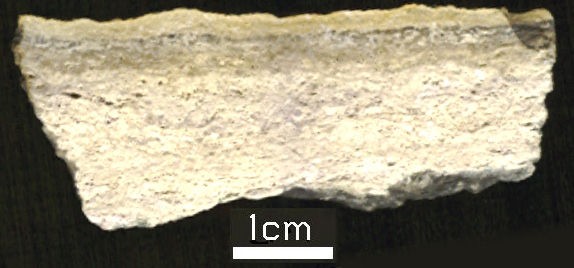
Etched section of paleosol from the Atlantic, San Salvador Island, Bahamas, indicating the top of the Pleistocene Grotto Beach Formation (limestone)

In geoscience, paleosol (palaeosol in Great Britain and Australia) is an ancient soil that formed in the past. The definition of the term in geology and paleontology is slightly different from its use in soil science.

In geology and paleontology, a paleosol is a former soil preserved by burial underneath either sediments (alluvium or loess) or volcanic deposits (lava flows or volcanic ash), which in the case of older deposits have lithified into rock. In Quaternary geology, sedimentology, paleoclimatology, and geology in general, it is the typical and accepted practice to use the term "paleosol" to designate such "fossil soils" found buried within sedimentary and volcanic deposits exposed in all continents.

In soil science the definition differs slightly: paleosols are soils formed long ago that have no relationship in their chemical and physical characteristics to the present-day climate or vegetation. Such soils are found within extremely old continental cratons, or in small scattered locations in outliers of other ancient rock domains.

== Properties ==
Because of the changes in the Earth's climate over the last 50 million years, soils formed under tropical rainforest (or even savanna) have become exposed to increasingly arid climates which cause former oxisols, ultisols or even alfisols to dry out in such a manner that a very hard crust is formed. This process has occurred so extensively in most parts of Australia as to restrict soil development—the former soil is effectively the parent material for a new soil, but it is so unweatherable that only a very poorly developed soil can exist in present dry climates, especially when they have become much drier during glacial periods in the Quaternary.

In other parts of Australia and in many parts of Africa, drying out of former soils has not been so severe. This has led to large areas of relict podsols in quite dry climates in the far southern inland of Australia (where temperate rainforest was formerly dominant) and to the formation of torrox soils (a suborder of oxisols) in southern Africa. Here, present climates allow, effectively, the maintenance of the old soils in climates under which they could not have formed from the parent material during the Mesozoic and Paleocene.

Paleosols in this sense are always exceedingly infertile soils, containing available phosphorus levels orders of magnitude lower than in temperate regions with younger soils. Ecological studies have shown that this has forced highly specialised evolution amongst Australian flora to obtain minimal nutrient supplies. The fact that soil formation is not occurring makes ecologically sustainable management even more difficult. However, paleosols often contain the most exceptional biodiversity due to the absence of competition.

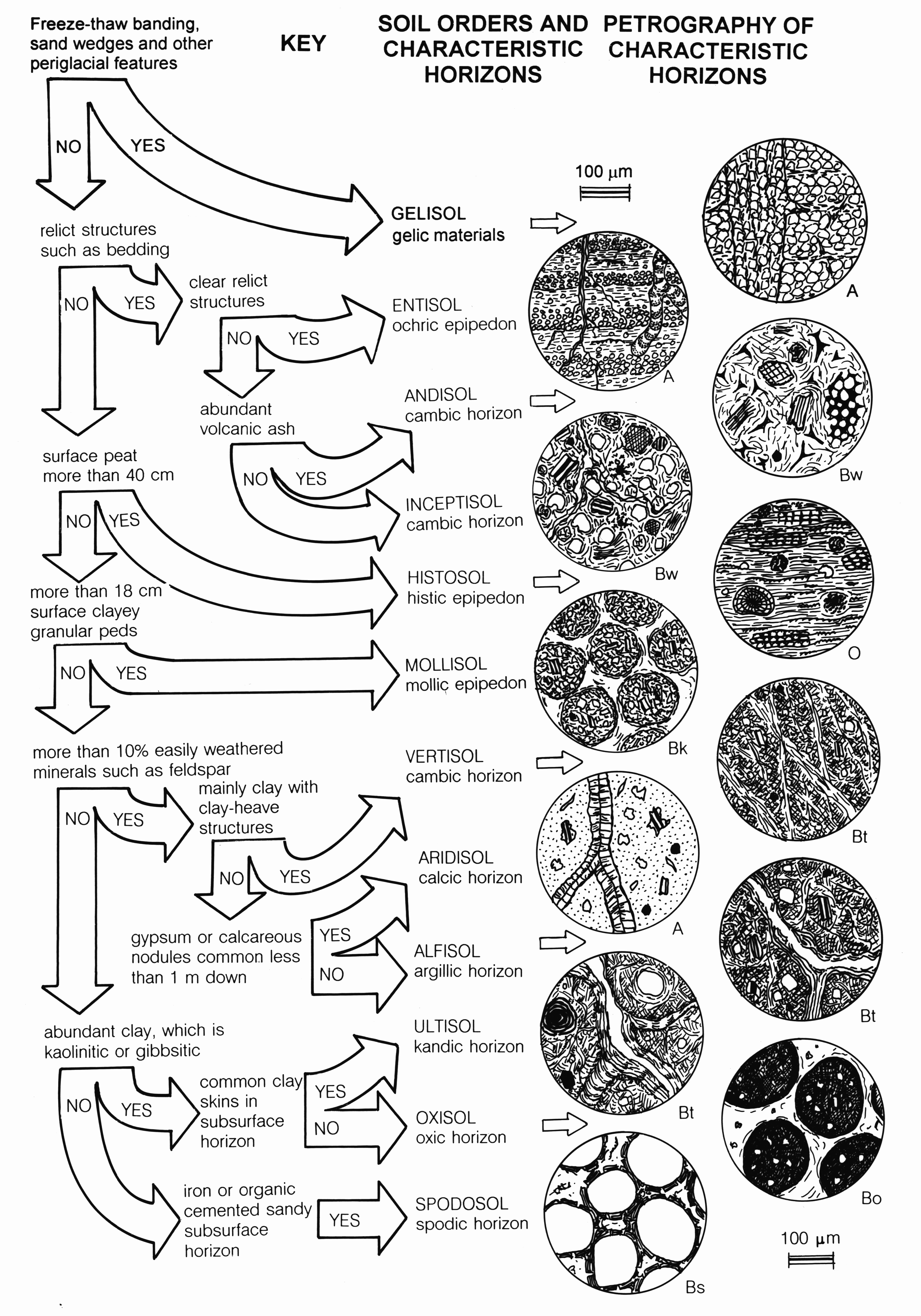
Key to soil orders of the US Taxonomy

== Taxonomic classification ==
The record of paleosols extends into the Precambrian in Earth's history, with rare paleosols older than 2.5 billion years. Geology, biology, and the atmosphere all changed significantly over that time, with dramatic shifts at the Great Oxidation Event (2.42 billion years ago) and during the Paleozoic, when complex animals and land plants proliferated.

Consequently, our modern soil classification system cannot be readily applied to paleosols. For example, a modern alfisol—broadly defined as a forest soil—would not have existed prior to the evolution of trees. More problematically, it is specifically defined by chemical properties that would not be preserved in the rock record. While modern soil orders are often used to describe paleosols in a qualitative sense, a paleosol-specific naming scheme has been proposed, although it is only used sporadically in the literature.

Until a paleosol-specific naming scheme is fully adopted, many paleo-pedologists have stuck to using the taxonomic classification of soils provided by the United States Department of Agriculture (USDA). The USDA soil taxonomy attempts to use the measurable properties and objective features within soils to classify them. The methodology developed a hierarchical structure among the different soil taxa, classifying the soils initially at a general level, then assigning soils to progressively more limited subdivisions.

The USDA soil taxonomy does come with drawbacks, including an emphasis on observable features, new nomenclature, and hierarchical organization. The emphasis on observable features can make the soil taxonomy similar in appearance to a legal document. The hierarchical structure cannot be applied more deeply than the order level regarding paleosols. However, despite these drawbacks, the USDA soil taxonomy is still the most comprehensive and influential soil classification system to date. To distinguish and identify paleosols from one another, certain diagnostic horizons and features need to be taken into account. For instance, all paleosols have an A horizon, but histosols have an O horizon above the A horizon.

== Identification ==
Rye & Holland (1998) laid out five criteria for identifying a paleosol. While this was prompted by the need for more stringent identification of Precambrian paleosols, it is applicable to paleosols of any age. The criteria are:

- Formed in situ on bedrock,
- soft-sediment deformation at the top of the profile, and
- up-profile changes in chemistry, texture, and mineralogy consistent with terrestrial weathering processes.

In the field, physical signs of a paleosol include evidence of horizonation (e.g., color and textural changes), bedrock incorporated into a finer overlying lithology (corestones), and evidence of surface processes (e.g., root traces, organic matter, burrows, redox alteration).

=== Soil types ===
Below is a list of soils and some of their diagnostic features that provides a framework for telling these paleosols, or even modern soils, apart:

==== Entisol (incipient soil) ====
Horizons (top-to-bottom): A & C

This soil has a very slight degree of soil formation. Original crystalline, metamorphic, or sedimentary features of the parent material experienced little alteration from soil formation. Most are found on young geomorphic surfaces such as flood plains and on steep slopes where erosion removes material as the soil forms. Signs of early successional vegetation of grasses and other herbs and shrubs. Root traces are diagnostic of this type of paleosol because of the small amount of alteration from their parent material in other respects. However, for Entisols of Ordivician age or older, a peak in magnetic susceptibility is indicative of an Entisol.

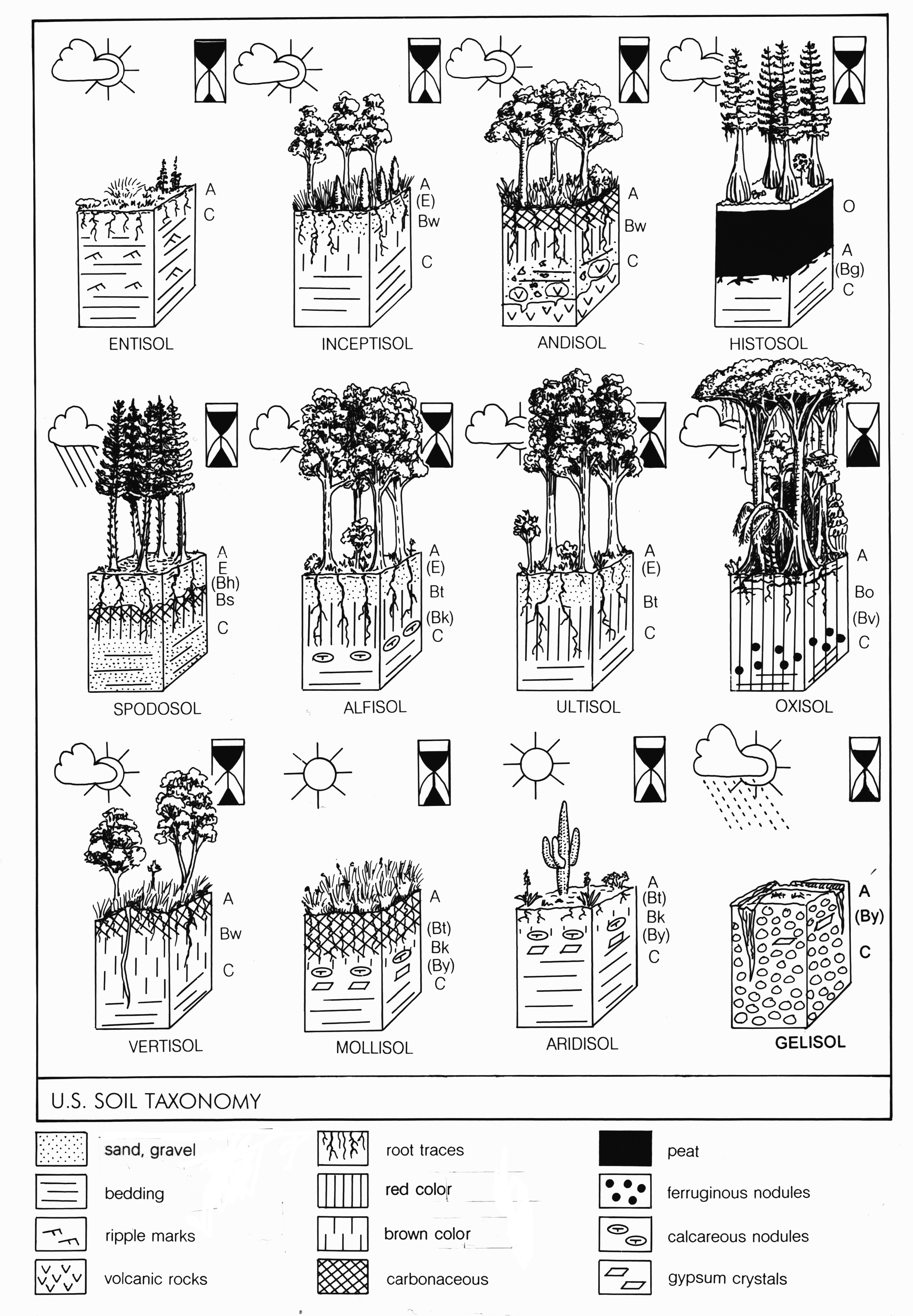
Cartoons of U.S. Taxonomy soil orders

==== Inceptisol (young soil) ====
Horizons: A, sometimes E, Bw, & C

These soils represent a stage of formation beyond Entisols, but not to the degree of development in other soil orders. Typically can be imagined as having a light-colored surface horizon over a moderately weathered subsurface horizon. Forms in low-rolling parts of landscapes in and around steep mountain fronts. Shrubby woodlands of pole trees that form during recolonization of disturbed ground by forests are particularly characteristic of this paleosol. Open woodlands and wooded grasslands are also characteristic of this paleosol.

==== Andisol (volcanic ash soil) ====
Horizons: A, Bw, & C

These are soils of volcanic ash of siliceous nature, consisting of bubbles or shards of volcanic glass with a high internal surface area. This soil weathers rapidly to imogolite and smectite. Thus they are highly fertile, rich in organic matter, and have particularly low bulk density. These properties and the aforementioned weathering products typically alter during burial, sometimes to distinctive minerals like celadonite and clinoptilolite. At least 60% recognizable pyroclastic fragments in thin sections are characteristic of this paleosol. This paleosol forms in and around volcanoes.

==== Histosol (peaty soil) ====
Horizons: O, A, sometimes Bg, & C

Organic-rich soils with thick peaty horizons, that form in cool, well drained localities or low-lying, permanently waterlogged areas. The primary formation process is accumulation of peat (organic matter), meaning organic matter is produced faster than it can decompose in the soil. The leaching or formation of gley minerals (pyrite or siderite) overprinting prior soil or sedimentary features is associated with peat accumulation.

==== Spodosol (forest soil) ====
Horizons: A, E, sometimes Bh, Bs, & C

A subsurface horizon enriched with iron and aluminum oxides or organic matter is characteristic of Spodosols. Displays opaque cements that form distinctive radially cracked, concretionary rims to abundant quartz grains in thin sections. Spodosols form on hilly bedrock or low, rolling quartz-rich sediments. Found principally in humid climates in which clay and soluble salts are dissolved and washed out of the profile and most common in temperate regions. Characteristic vegetation are conifer forests and other kinds of evergreen woody vegetation that can tolerate low nutrient levels and high soil acidity.

==== Alfisol (fertile forest soil) ====
Horizons: A, sometimes E, Bt, sometimes Bk, & C

Base-rich forested soils that have a light-colored surface horizon over a clayey subsurface horizon, rich in exchangeable cations. If paleosols contain nodules of carbonate in a horizon deep within the profile, such base saturation can be assumed. If lacking in carbonate nodules, Alfisols can be distinguished by the abundance of base rich clays or by molecular weathering ratios of alumina/bases of less than 2. These soils are not found at the poles or on high mountain tops.

==== Ultisol (base-poor forest soil) ====
Horizons: A, sometimes E, Bt, & C

Base-poor forest soils that are similar to Alfisols at first glance. However, Ultisols are more deeply weathered of mineral nutrients. There should not be any calcareous material anywhere within an Ultisol profile and have molecular weathering ratios of alumina/bases of more than 2. Kaolinite and highly weathered aluminous minerals such as gibbsite are common in the profile. Low-base status is attributed to a long formation time. Form mostly on older parts of landscapes, such as rolling hills of bedrock, high alluvial terraces, and plateau tops. Natural vegetation consists of coniferous or hardwood forests.

==== Oxisol (tropical deeply-weathered soil) ====
Horizons: A, Bo, sometimes Bv, & C

Deeply weathered soils with texturally uniform profiles. Dominated by kaolinitic clays or other base-poor oxides such as gibbsite or boehmite. Contains molecular weathering ratios of alumina/bases of 10 or more. These soils have deeply weathered mottled horizons. Characteristic of this type of paleosol is a stable microstructure of sand-sized spherical micropeds of iron-stained lay. Very old, often amounting to tens of millions of years. Found on stable continental locations on gentle slopes of plateaus, terraces, and plains. The natural vegetation for Oxisols is a rainforest.

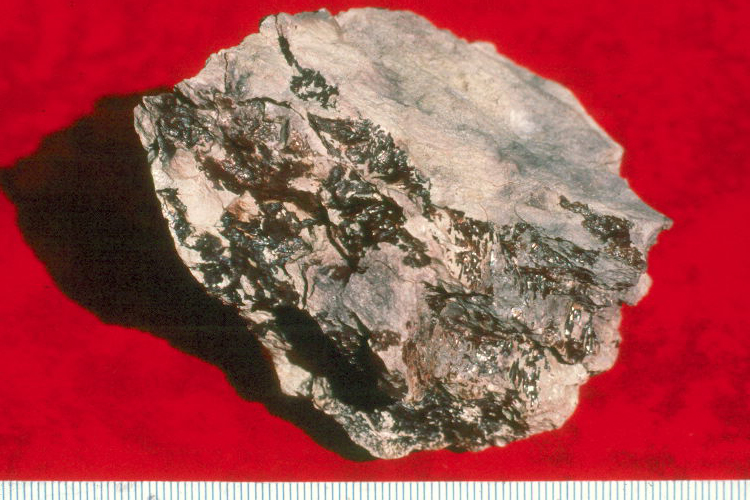
Blocky angular peds in an Eocene paleosol

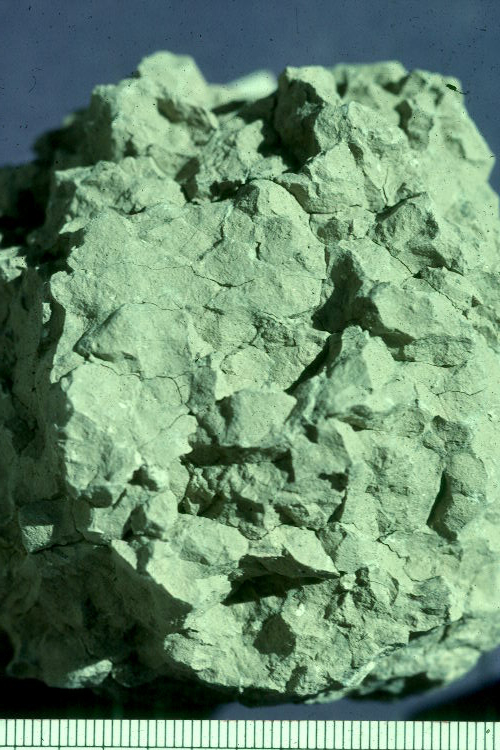
Granular peds in an Oligocene paleosol

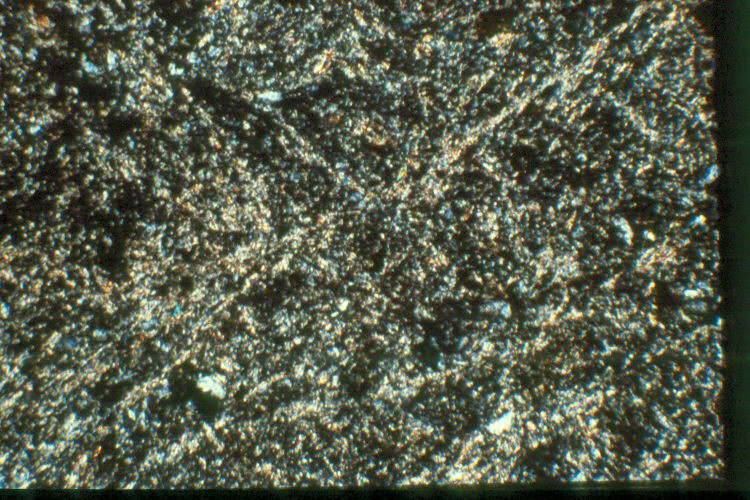
Clinobimasepic plasmic fabric in a Cretaceous paleosol

==== Vertisol (swelling clay soil) ====
Horizons: A, Bw, & C

These are uniform, thick, clayey soils that have deep, wide cracks. Cracking can produce a hummock-and-swale topography. Mostly composed of smectitic clays. Most Vertisols are found on intermediate to basaltic materials. Found mainly in flat terrain at the foot of gentle slopes. Climate and vegetation are dry and sparse enough that alkaline reactions can be maintained. Vegetation ranges from grassland to open woodland, with wooded grassland being common.

==== Mollisol (grassland soil) ====
Horizons: A, sometimes Bt, Bk, sometimes By, & C

Well-developed, base-rich, surface horizon of intimately mixed clay and organic matter. An abundance of fine root traces and crumb ped structures are characteristic of this paleosol. The surface horizon characteristic of this paleosol is created by fine root systems of grassy vegetation and the burrowing activity of many soil invertebrate species. Mollisols are found in low, rolling, or flat country.

==== Aridisol (desert soil) ====
Horizons: A, sometimes Bt, Bk, sometimes By, & C

Forms in arid to semi-arid regions, and that lack of rain allows for the creation of shallow calcareous, gypsiferous, or salty horizons. These cements form large nodules or continuous layers. Light-colored, soft, and often vesicular surface horizon. Subsurface horizons are not cemented with any of the aforementioned cements. Mostly found in low-lying areas because steep slopes in arid regions tend to be eroded back to bedrock. Vegetation is sparse and includes prickly shrubs and cacti.

==== Gelisol (permafrost soil) ====
Horizons: A, sometimes By, & C

Soils with ground ice or other permafrost features within one meter of the surface. In paleosols, locations of ice can be preserved as clastic dikes, freeze banding, or other deformations created by ground ice. Tillites and other glacigenic deposits are indicative of Gelisols. These soils form under polar desert, tundra, and taiga vegetation. Includes a surprising array of histic epipedons, desert pavements, salic, and calcic horizons.

Many other factors, such as ped structures, such as the presence of blocky, angular or granular peds and fabric type, like clinobimasepic plasmic fabric, are structures that can help one identify if they are dealing with a paleosol. Some of these structures are very helpful when narrowing down the paleosol that is being identified. However, any paleosol should be verified geochemically before use in proxy-based reconstructions; post-deposition alteration processes, such as potassium metasomatism, can change a paleosol's chemistry without dramatically altering its physical appearance.

== Applications ==
=== Paleoclimate reconstructions ===
Palaeosols are frequently used as palaeoclimatological tools for gauging the climate in which they formed. Because rates and styles of weathering are dependent on climatic factors, paleosols can be used to reconstruct variables of past climate. Mean annual precipitation (MAP) and air temperature (MAAT) are two commonly-reconstructed variables which, along with seasonality and in conjunction with other paleoenvironmental tools, can be used to describe past terrestrial climates. A suite of paleoclimatic proxies exist and while they vary in focus, many rely on changes in chemical composition throughout a soil profile that occur during weathering, burial, and post-burial processes.

Their use depends on factors such as post-burial alteration, parent material, and soil order; not every proxy is applicable to every paleosol. Most proxies are applicable to Phanerozoic paleosols (not older), as landscape processes changed dramatically after the rise of land plants. Seasonality (the presence and strength of seasons) requires a more nuanced reconstruction approach. Proposed seasonality proxies primarily rely on a soil wetting/drying process, during which pedogenic carbonate can form; like other proxies, this tool is continually being tested and refined.

=== Paleoatmosphere reconstructions ===
Soils form in near-constant contact with the atmosphere, so their chemical composition is affected by the composition of the atmosphere through both direct and indirect pathways. The oxidation of paleosols has been used as an indicator of atmospheric oxygen, which has risen over Earth's history. Paleosols have also been used to reconstruct atmospheric carbon dioxide levels, based on modern studies of soil carbon gas exchange, carbon isotopes in pedogenic carbonate nodules, and mass-balance approaches taking multiple atmospheric gases (typically carbon dioxide, oxygen, and methane) into account. These methods are being actively developed in the field of early Earth research.

=== Paleobotany ===
Paleosols are an important archive of information about ancient ecosystems and various components of fossil soils can be used to study past plant life. Paleosols often contain ancient plant materials such as pollen grains and phytoliths, a biomineralized form of silica produced by many plants such as grasses. Both pollen and phytolith fossils from different plant species have characteristic shapes that can be traced back to their parent plants. Over long geological time scales, phytoliths may not necessarily be preserved in paleosols due to ability of the poorly crystalline silica to dissolve.

Another indicator of plant community composition in paleosols is the carbon isotopic signature. The ratio of different carbon isotopes in organic matter in paleosols reflects the proportions of plants using C3 photosynthesis, which grow in cooler and wetter climates, versus plants using C4 photosynthesis, which are better adapted to hotter and drier conditions. Other methods for detecting past plant life in paleosols are based on identifying the remains of leaf waxes, which are slow to break down in soils over time.

=== Paleoseismology ===
As records of previous Earth surfaces that can be stacked on one another, paleosol sequences are also valuable for paleoseismology.

== See also ==
- Paleopedology
- Paleopedological record
- Pedogenesis
- Pedology (soil study)
