= Index of branches of science =

Alphabetical list of scientific disciplines

The following index is provided as an overview of and topical guide to science: Links to articles and redirects to sections of articles which provide information on each topic are listed with a short description of the topic. When there is more than one article with information on a topic, the most relevant is usually listed, and it may be cross-linked to further information from the linked page or section.

Science (from Latin scientia, meaning "knowledge") is a systematic enterprise that builds and organizes knowledge in the form of testable explanations and predictions about the universe.

The branches of science, also referred to as scientific fields, scientific disciplines, or just sciences, can be arbitrarily divided into three major groups:

- The natural sciences (biology, chemistry, physics, astronomy, and Earth sciences), which study nature in the broadest sense;
- The social sciences (e.g. psychology, sociology, economics, history) which study people and societies; and
- The formal sciences (e.g. mathematics, logic, theoretical computer science), which study abstract concepts.

Disciplines that use science, such as engineering and medicine, are described as applied sciences.

== A ==
- Abiology – Life arising from non-living matter – study of inanimate, inorganic, or lifeless things.
- Abiophysiology – The study of non-organic biological processes
- Acanthochronology – Study of cactus spines and the chronology of their growth
- Acanthology – The study of spined things, in particular sea urchins, and the resultant impact on taxonomy
- Acarology – Study of mites and ticks
- Aceology – The study of therapies – science of remedies, or of therapeutics; iamatology.
- Acology – Science of medical remedies, or of therapeutics.
- Acoustics – Branch of physics involving mechanical waves – the branch of physics studying the properties of sound.
- Actinobiology – Study of effects of radiation on living things – synonymous with radiobiology.
- Adenology – Branch of medicine dealing the endocrine system
- Aerobiology – Study of airborne organisms
- Aerodonetics – Science or study of gliding flight.
- Aerodynamics – Branch of dynamics concerned with studying the motion of air
- Aerolithology – Science of meteorites – study of aerolites; meteorites.
- Aerology – Synonym for atmospheric science
- Aeronautics – Science of air flight-capable machines
- Aeropalynology – Study of pollen and spores in Earths atmosphere – study of pollens and spores in atmosphere.
- Aerospace engineering – Branch of engineering
- Aerostatics – Study of gases that are not in motion
- Agnoiology – Study of ignorance
- Agonistics – Chemical which binds to and activates a biochemical receptor
- Agricultural chemistry – Agricultural sub-discipline of applied chemistry – study of influence in chemical processes in plants.
- Agriology – comparative study of primitive peoples.
- Agrobiology – Interdisciplinary studies of the interactions between plants and soil
- Agroecology – Study of ecological processes in agriculture
- Agrogeology – Study of origins and applications of minerals important to farming
- Agrology – The study of soils, especially agricultural soils.
- Agronomics – Branch of economics about distribution, management, and productivity of land.
- Agronomy – Science of producing and using plants
- Agrostology – Scientific study of the grasses
- Algebra – Branch of mathematics - study of algebraic structures and the operations they use
- Algedonics – Branch of psychology that deals with pleasant and unpleasant states of consciousness
- Algology – Branch of biology concerned with the study of algae (botany)
- Algology – Medical treatment of pain as practiced in Greece and Turkey
- Allergology – Study of the causes and treatment of allergies - study of causes and treatment of allergies
- Anaesthesiology – Medical specialty concerned with anesthesia and perioperative care
- Anatomy – Study of the structure of organisms
- Andragogy – Methods and principles in adult education
- Andrology – Medical specialty – study of men's physiology.
- Anemology – Study of winds – study of wind.
- Angiology – Branch of internal medicine, which deals with vascular disease
- Anthropobiology – Biological study of the human species – study of human biology.
- Anthropology – Scientific study of humans, human behavior, and societies – study of human cultures.
- Anthrozoology – Subset of ethnobiology – study of human-animal interaction.
- Apiology – Scientific study of bees
- Aquatic ecology – The study of interactions between organisms and the environment in water
- Arachnology – Scientific study of arachnides such as spiders, ticks and mites
- Archaeology – Study of human activity based on materials left behind
- Archival science – Science of storage, registration and preservation of historical data
- Archology – science of the origins of government.
- Areology – Scientific study of the surface, crust, and interior of the planet Mars
- Aristology – science or art of dining.
- Aromachology – Study of the influence of odors on human behavior
- Arthrology – Scientific study of joints and articulations
- Arthropodology – Study of arthropods
- Astacology – Scientific study of crayfish
- Asteroseismology – Study of oscillations in stars
- Astheniology – Physical symptom – study of diseases of weakening and aging.
- Astrobotany – Study of plants grown in spacecraft
- Astrobiology – Science concerned with life in the universe
- Astrodynamics – Field of classical mechanics concerned with the motion of spacecraft
- Astrogeology – Geology of astronomical objects apparently in orbit around stellar objects
- Astronautics – Theory and practice of space travel
- Astronomy – Scientific study of celestial objects
- Astrophysics – Subfield of astronomy – study of behaviour of interstellar matter.
- Audiology – Branch of science that studies hearing, balance, and related disorders
- Autecology – Study of interactions of individual organisms with the environment
- Automata theory – Study of abstract machines and automata
- Auxology – Study of all aspects of human physical growth

== B ==
- Bacteriology – Subdiscipline of microbiology that studies bacteria
- Ballistics – Science of the motion of projectiles
- Balneology – Method of treating diseases by bathing – science of the therapeutic use of baths.
- Barodynamics – science of the support and mechanics of heavy structures
- Bathymetry – Study of underwater depth of lake or ocean floors
- Batology – Study of brambles
- Batrachology – Branch of herpetology that studies amphibians
- Behavioural genetics – Study of genetic-environment interactions influencing behaviour
- Behavioral neuroscience – Study of biological and neural mechanisma in behaviour
- Bibliology – Organized listing of books and the systematic description of them as objects
- Bibliotics – study of documents to determine authenticity.
- Bioecology – Study of interrelations of plants and animals with their environment
- Biogeochemistry – Study of chemical cycles of the earth related to biological activity
- Biology – Scientific study of life
- Biochemistry – Study of chemical processes of living organisms
- Biomechanics – Study of the mechanics of biological systems
- Biometrics – Metrics related to human characteristics
- Bionomics – Term with different meanings in ecology or economics – study of organisms interacting in their environments.
- Biophysics – Interdisciplinary science – study of physics of biological phenomena.
- Biopsychology – Study of biological and neural mechanisma in behaviour – application of the science of biology to the study of psychology.
- Biotribology – Study of friction, wear and lubrication in biological systems – study of friction, wear and lubrication of biological systems.
- Botany – Study of plant life
- Bromatology – Applied science devoted to the study of food – study of food.
- Bryology – Branch of botany concerned with the study of bryophytes – study of mosses and liverworts.

== C ==
- Cacogenics – Decrease in genetic traits deemed desirable and study thereof
- Caliology – Place where a bird lays its eggs – study of bird's nests.
- Campanology – Scientific and musical study of bells
- Carcinology – Study of crustaceans
- Cardiology – Branch of medicine dealing with the heart
- Caricology – Study of sedges
- Carpology – Study of seeds and fruit
- Cartography – Study and practice of making maps – science of making maps and globes.
- Castrametation – Roman term for a fortified military base – art of designing a camp.
- Catallactics – Theory about the free market system in economies – science of commercial exchange.
- Celestial mechanics – Branch of astronomy – study of motion of objects in outer space.
- Cell biology – Branch of biology that studies cells – study of the different structures and functions of both eukaryote and prokaryote cells.
- Cetology – Study of whales, dolphins, porpoises, and other cetaceans – study of whales and dolphins.
- Chaology – Field of mathematics and science based on non-linear systems and initial conditions
- Chaos theory – Field of mathematics and science based on non-linear systems and initial conditions
- Characterology – Academic study of character – study of development of character.
- Chemistry – Scientific study of matter's behavior and properties – study of properties and behaviours of substances.
- Chirography – Study of penmanship and handwriting in all of its aspects – study of handwriting or penmanship.
- Chiropody – Medicine branch focusing on the human lower extremities
- Chorology – Study of geographic causal relationships – science of the geographic description of anything.
- Chrematistics – Economics theory studying money – study of wealth; political economy.
- Chromatics – Technique to quantify and describe physically the human color perception – study of color.
- Chronobiology – Study of rhythms in biological processes of living organisms – study of biological rhythms.
- Chrysology – study of precious metals.
- Classical mechanics – Description of large objects' physics – study of motion of macroscopic objects.
- Climatology – Scientific study of climate – study of climate.
- Codicology – Study of codices or manuscript books
- Cognitive science – Interdisciplinary scientific study of cognitive processes
- Coleopterology – Branch of entomology studying beetles
- Cometology – study of comets.
- Computer science – Study of computation – study of processes that interact with data.
- Conchology – Study of mollusc shells
- Coniology – Study of atmospheric dust and its effects
- Connectomics – Study of mapping wiring diagrams
- Contact mechanics – Study of the deformation of solids that touch each other
- Coprology – Study of faeces
- Cosmetology – Study and application of beauty treatment – study of cosmetics.
- Cosmochemistry – Study of the chemical composition of matter in the universe
- Cosmology – Scientific study of the origin, evolution, and eventual fate of the universe
- Craniology – Pseudoscientific study of human skull shape – study of the skull.
- Criminology – Field of studies related to crimes
- Cryobiology – Study of effects of extreme low temperatures on life
- Cryptography – Practice and study of secure communication techniques
- Cryptology – Practice and study of secure communication techniques – study of codes.
- Cybernetics – Study of circular causal processes
- Cyclonology – study of tropical cyclones, e.g. hurricanes.
- Cynology – Study of canines or domestic dogs
- Cytology – Study of cells in terms of structure, function and chemistry

== D ==
- Dactyliology – study of finger rings.
- Dactylography – Scientific study of fingerprints
- Dactylology – Form of communication using one or both hands – study of sign language.
- Data science – Field of study to extract knowledge from data – study of analyzing, processing, interpreting and extracting data.
- Demography – Study of human populations and their structures
- Demology – study of human populations and behaviour.
- Dendrochronology – Method of dating based on the analysis of patterns of tree rings
- Dendrology – Science and study of woody plants
- Dermatoglyphics – Scientific study of finger- and toeprints
- Dermatology – Field of medicine dealing with the hair, nails, skin, and its diseases
- Desmology – Study of ligaments
- Dialectology – Scientific study of linguistic dialect
- Dietetics – Study of diet and nutrition in relation to health and disease
- Dioptrics – Science of light and lenses
- Diplomatics – Academic study of the protocols of documents – science of deciphering ancient writings and texts.
- Dosiology – study of dosage of drugs.
- Dynamics – Study of forces and their effect on motion
- Dysgenics – Decrease in genetic traits deemed desirable and study thereof.

== E ==
- Eccrinology – Sweat gland distributed almost all over the human body – study of excretion.
- Ecology – Study of organisms and their environment
- Economics – Social science studying goods and services – study of material wealth (production, distribution, and consumption of goods and services).
- Edaphology – Science concerned with the influence of soils on living beings
- Egyptology – Scientific study of ancient Egypt – study of ancient Egypt.
- Eidology – study of mental imagery.
- Ekistics – Conceptual framework
- Electrochemistry – Branch of physical chemistry – study of relations between electricity and chemicals.
- Electrodynamics – Fundamental interaction between charged particles – study of the effects arising from the interactions of electric currents with magnets, with other currents, or with themselves.
- Electrohydrodynamics – Study of electrically conducting fluids in the presence of electric fields – the study of dynamics of electrically charged fluids.
- Electrology – Method of hair removal – study of electricity.
- Electrostatics – Study of still or slow electric charges – study of static electricity.
- Electromagnetism – Fundamental interaction between charged particles – study of electromagnetic force.
- Embryology – Branch of biology, studying prenatal biology
- Emetology – Involuntary, forceful expulsion of stomach contents, typically via the mouth – study of vomiting.
- Emmenology – study of menstruation.
- Endemiology – study of local diseases.
- Endocrinology – Branch of medicine pertaining to the endocrine system
- Energetics – study of energy under transformation within various fields.
- Engineering studies – Academic field – study of engineering.
- Enigmatology – Problem or enigma that tests a person's ingenuity – study of enigmas (puzzles).
- Entomology – Scientific study of insects
- Entozoology – study of parasites that live inside larger organisms.
- Enzymology – Large biological molecule that acts as a catalyst – study of enzymes.
- Ephebiatrics – Medical subspecialty for adolescents – branch of medicine dealing with adolescence.
- Epidemiology – Study of health and disease within a population
- Epileptology – Physician specializing in epileptology – study of epilepsy.
- Eremology – study of deserts.
- Ergology – study of effects of work on humans.
- Ergonomics – Designing systems to suit their users – study of people at work.
- Escapology – Practice of escaping from restraints – study of freeing oneself from constraints.
- Ethnobiology – Study of how living things are used by human cultures – study of dynamic relationships between peoples.
- Ethnobotany – Study of traditional plant use – study of a region's plants and their practical uses through the traditional knowledge of a local culture and people.
- Ethnogeny – study of origins of races or ethnic groups.
- Ethnochoreology – Field of dance study – study of dances and its implication in culture.
- Ethnomusicology – Study of the cultural aspects of music – study of comparative musical systems.
- Ethnology – Branch of anthropology – study of cultures.
- Ethnomethodology – Study of how social order is produced – study of everyday communication and social interaction.
- Ethology – Study of animal behaviour – study of natural or biological character.
- Ethonomics – Personal value, basis for ethical action – study of economic and ethical principles of a society.
- Etiology – Study of causation, or origination
- Etymology – Study of the origin and evolution of words – study of origins of words.
- Euthenics – Study of improving living conditions to increase well-being – science concerned with improving living conditions.
- Exobiology – Science concerned with life in the universe – study of extraterrestrial life.
- Exoplanetology – study of exoplanets.

== F ==
- Felinology – Study of cats – study of felines.
- Finance – Academic discipline studying businesses and investments – science or study of money management.
- Fluid dynamics – Aspects of fluid mechanics involving fluid flow
- Fluid mechanics – Branch of physics – study of fluids behaviour at rest and in motion.
- Fluid statics – Branch of fluid mechanics that studies fluids at rest – study of fluids behaviour at rest.
- Fluviology – study of watercourses.
- Folkloristics – Branch of anthropology – study of folklore and fables.
- Forestry – Science and craft of managing woodlands – study of the creation, management, use, conservation, and repair of forests and associated resources.
- Fracture mechanics – Study of propagation of cracks in materials
- Futurology – Study of postulating possible, probable, and preferable futures
- Forensic science – Application of science to law and investigation – the use of scientific methods or expertise to investigate crimes or examine evidence that might be presented in a court of law

== G ==
- Garbology – Study of modern refuse
- Gastroenterology – Branch of medicine focused on the digestive system and its disorders
- Gastronomy – Study of the relationship between food and culture
- Gemmology – Science dealing with natural and artificial gemstone materials – study of gems and jewels
- Gender studies – Interdisciplinary field of study – study of gender
- Genealogy – Study of family lineage and history – study of descent of families
- Genesiology – study of reproduction and heredity
- Genetics – Science of genes, heredity and variation
- Geochemistry – Science that applies chemistry to analyze geological systems – study of chemistry of the Earth's crust
- Geochronology – Science of determining the age of rocks, sediments and fossils – study of measuring geological time
- Geography – Study of Earth's spatial information – study of surface of the earth and its inhabitants
- Geology – Scientific study of Earth's physical composition – study of the rocks of a planet
- Geometry – Branch of mathematics – study the sizes, shapes, positions, angles and dimensions of things.
- Geomorphogeny – study of the characteristics, origins, and development of land forms
- Geomorphology – Scientific study of landforms – study of landforms and landform evolution
- Geoponics – Science of cultivating the earth – study of agriculture
- Geotechnics – Scientific study of earth materials in engineering problems – study of increasing habitability of the Earth
- Geratology – Study of the biological, psychological, and social aspects of aging – study of decadence and decay
- Gerocomy – study of old age
- Gerontology – Study of the biological, psychological, and social aspects of aging
- Gigantology – study of giants
- Glaciology – Scientific study of ice and natural phenomena involving ice
- Glossology – Scientific study of language – study of language; study of the tongue
- Gnomonics – Study of sundials – the art of measuring time using sundials
- Gnotobiology – Organism with fully-known microorganisms – study of life in germ-free conditions
- Googology – Numbers significantly larger than those used regularly – study of large numbers
- Graminology – Scientific study of the grasses
- Grammatology – Study of graphemes and writing systems – study of systems of writing
- Graphemics – Study of graphemes and writing systems – study of systems of representing speech in writing
- Graphology – Pseudoscientific analysis of handwriting – study of handwriting
- Gromatics – Ancient Roman land surveyors – science of surveying
- Gynaecology – Medical area for women's reproductive health – study of women's physiology
- Gyrostatics – study of rotating bodies

== H ==
- Haemataulics – study of movement of blood through blood vessels
- Halieutics – study of fishing
- Harmonics – Science of musical sounds
- Helcology – study of ulcers
- Heliology – Scientific study of the sun
- Helioseismology – Study of the structure and dynamics of the Sun through its oscillation
- Helminthology – Study of parasitic worms (helminths)
- Hematology – Study of blood and blood diseases
- Hemodynamics – Dynamics of blood flow – study of the dynamics behind blood circulation
- Hepatology – Medical specialty – study of liver, gallbladder, biliary tree, and pancreas
- Hermeology – study of Mercury
- Herpetology – Study of amphibians and reptiles
- Hippiatrics – study of diseases of horses
- Hippology – Study of horses
- Histology – Study of the microscopic anatomy of cells and tissues of plants and animals
- Histopathology – Microscopic examination of tissue in order to study and diagnose disease – study of changes in tissue due to disease
- Historiography – Study of the methods used by historians
- Historiology – The study of history.
- Home economics – Study of household management
- Hoplology – Study of human combative behavior and performance
- Horography – art of constructing sundials or clocks
- Horology – Art or science of measuring time – science of time measurement
- Horticulture – Small-scale cultivation of plants – study of gardening
- Hydraulics – Applied engineering involving liquids – study of application of engineering, chemistry and other fields of science involving the use of liquids
- Hydrobiology – Science of life and life processes in water – study of aquatic organisms
- Hydrodynamics – Study of liquids in motion
- Hydrogeology – Study of groundwater's movement and distribution
- Hydrography – Measurement of bodies of water
- Hydrokinetics – study of motion of fluids
- Hydrology – Science of the movement, distribution, and quality of water on Earth – study of water resources
- Hydrometeorology – Branch of meteorology and hydrology – study of atmospheric moisture
- Hydrostatics – Branch of fluid mechanics that studies fluids at rest
- Hyetology – science of rainfall
- Hygiastics – science of health and hygiene
- Hygienics – Practices performed to preserve health – study of sanitation; health
- Hygiology – hygienics; study of cleanliness
- Hygroscopy – Phenomenon of attracting and holding water molecules – study of humidity
- Hygrometry – Study of gas-vapor mixtures – science of humidity
- Hypnology – Study of sleep and hypnotic phenomena – study of sleep; study of hypnosis.
- Hypsography – Geographical measurement – science of measuring heights

== I ==
- Iamatology – Obsolete synonym for the study of therapies.
- Iatrology – treatise or text on medical topics; study of medicine
- Ichnography – Architectural drawing showing interior layout of a building – art of drawing ground plans; a ground plan
- Ichnology – Study of trace fossils
- Ichthyology – Scientific study of fish
- Iconography – Branch of art history – study of drawing symbols
- Iconology – Method of interpretation in cultural history – study of icons; symbols
- Ideogeny – study of origins of ideas
- Ideology – Set of beliefs or values – science of ideas; system of ideas used to justify behaviour
- Idiomology – study of idiom, jargon or dialect
- Idiopsychology – study of the psychology of one's own mind
- Immunochemistry – Study of the chemistry of the immune system
- Immunogenetics – Branch of medical genetics – study of genetic characteristics of immunity
- Immunology – Branch of medicine studying the immune system
- Immunopathology – Branch of medicine that deals with immune responses associated with disease
- Information science – Academic field concerned with collection and analysis of information
- Information technology (IT) – Computer-based technologies
- Insectology – Scientific study ofi insects, or relationships between insects and humans
- Irenology – Social science study of peace – study of peace

== J ==
- Japanology – Area studies focused on Japan – The study of Japan, its language, culture and history

== K ==
- Kalology – study of beauty
- Karstology – Scientific study of the various aspects of karst regions
- Karyology – Photographic display of total chromosome complement in a cell – study of cell nuclei
- Kinematics – Branch of physics describing the motion of objects without considering forces – study of motion
- Kinesics – Interpretation of body motion communication – study of gestural communication
- Kinesiology – Study of human body movement – study of human movement and posture
- Kinetics – Subfield of physics – study of forces producing or changing motion
- Koniology – Study of atmospheric dust and its effects – study of atmospheric pollutants and dust
- Ktenology – Scientific study of killing
- Kymatology – Branch of physics – study of wave motion

== L ==
- Larithmics – study of population statistics
- Laryngology – Medical specialty that deals with the larynx
- Lepidopterology – Branch of entomology that studies moths and butterflies
- Leprology – The study of leprosy and its treatment
- Lexicology – Linguistic discipline studying words – study of words and their meanings
- Lexigraphy – Grapheme which represents a word or a morpheme – art of definition of words
- Library science – Branch of academic disciplines – study of collection of information
- Lichenology – Branch of mycology that studies lichens
- Library and information science – Branch of academic disciplines – study of organization, access, collection, and protection/regulation of information, whether in physical or digital forms.
- Limacology – Study of slugs
- Limnobiology – study of freshwater ecosystems
- Limnology – Science of inland aquatic ecosystems
- Linguistics – Scientific study of language
- Loimology – study of plagues and epidemics
- Logics – Study of correct reasoning
- Loxodromy – study of sailing along rhumb-lines
- Ludology – Study of games and the act of playing them

== M ==
- Macroeconomics – Study of an economy as a whole – branch of economics dealing with the performance, structure, behavior, and decision-making of the whole economy
- Magnetics – Class of physical phenomena – study of magnetism
- Magnetohydrodynamics – Model of electrically conducting fluids – study of electrically conducting fluids
- Magnetostatics – Branch of physics about magnetism in systems with steady electric currents – study of magnetic fields in systems where the currents are steady
- Malacology – Study of molluscs
- Malariology – Study of the mosquito borne disease, malaria
- Mammalogy – Study of mammals
- Marine biology – Scientific study of ocean life – study of the ocean's ecosystem
- Mastology – Study of mammals – study of mammals
- Mathematics – Field of knowledge – study of magnitude, number, and forms
- Mazology – mammalogy; study of mammals
- Mechanics – Science concerned with physical bodies subjected to forces or displacements
- Meconology – study of or treatise concerning opium
- Media studies – Field of study that deals with media
- Medicine – Diagnosis, treatment, and prevention of illness
- Melissopalynology – Study of pollen contained in honey
- Melittology – Scientific study of bees
- Melology – Scholarly study of music – study of music; musicology
- Mereology – Study of parts and the wholes they form – study of part-whole relationships
- Mesology – Study of organisms and their environment – ecology
- Metallogeny – Study of the genesis and geographic distribution of mineral deposits – study of the origin and distribution of metal deposits
- Metallography – Study of metals using microscopy – study of the structure and constitution of metals
- Metallurgy – Field of science that studies the physical and chemical behavior of metals
- Metaphysics – Study of fundamental reality – study of principles of nature and thought
- Metapolitics – Political discourse about politics itself – study of politics in theory or abstract
- Metapsychology – Psychological aspect – study of nature of the mind
- Metascience – Scientific study of science
- Meteoritics – Scientific study of meteors, meteorites and meteoroids
- Meteorology – Interdisciplinary scientific study of the atmosphere focusing on weather forecasting
- Methodology – Study of research methods
- Methyology – study of alcohol
- Metrology – Science of measurement and its application
- Microanatomy – Study of the microscopic anatomy of cells and tissues
- Microbial ecology – Study of the relationship of microorganisms with their environment
- Microbiology – Study of microscopic organisms (microbes)
- Microclimatology – Local set of atmospheric conditions that differ significantly from the surrounding area – study of local climates
- Microeconomics – Behavior of individuals and firms – branch of economics that studies the behavior of individual households and firms in making decisions on the allocation of limited resources
- Micrology – study or discussion of trivialities
- Micropalaeontology – Branch of paleontology that studies microfossils
- Microphytology – study of very small plant life
- Military science – Theory, method, and practice of producing military capability
- Mineralogy – Scientific study of minerals and mineralised artifacts
- Molecular biology – Branch of biology that studies biological systems at the molecular level
- Molinology – Study of devices which use energy for mechanical purposes
- Momilogy – study of mummies
- Morphology – study of forms and the development of structures
- Morphometrics – Quantitative study of size and shape – study of size and shape
- Muscology – Branch of botany concerned with the study of bryophytes – study of mosses
- Museology – Study of museums
- Musicology – Scholarly study of music – study of music
- Mycology – Study of fungi
- Myology – Study of the muscular system – study of muscles
- Myrmecology – Study of ants
- Mythology – Type of traditional narrative – study of myths; fables; tales

== N ==
- Naology – study of church or temple architecture
- Nautics – study and art of navigation
- Navigation – Process of monitoring and controlling the movement of a craft or vehicle – study of controlling a movement of a vehicle from one place to another
- Necroplanetology – Study of the process of planetary destruction – study of the destruction of planets
- Nematology – Scientific study of roundworms
- Neonatology – Medical care of newborns, especially the ill or premature
- Neossology – study of nestling birds
- Nephology – Scientific study of clouds
- Nephrology – Medical study concerned with the kidneys
- Neurobiology – Scientific study of the nervous system
- Neuroeconomics – Interdisciplinary field – study of human decision making and the ability to process multiple alternatives and to choose an optimal course of action
- Neurology – Medical specialty dealing with disorders of the nervous system
- Neuropsychology – Study of the brain related to specific psychological processes and behaviors
- Neuroscience – Scientific study of the nervous system – study of development, work and structure of nervous system
- Neurypnology – study of hypnotism
- Neutrosophy – study of the origin and nature of philosophical neutralities
- Nomology – Science of laws in philosophy
- Noology – Spanish philosopher (1898–1983) – science of the intellect
- Nosology – Branch of medicine that deals with classification of diseases
- Nostology – study of senility
- Notaphily – Study and collection of paper currency – study and collecting of bank-notes and cheques
- Numismatics – Study of currencies, coins and paper money
- Nymphology – study of nymphs
- Nanotechnology – Technology with features near one nanometer

== O ==
- Obstetrics – Medical specialty concerning pregnancy and childbirth
- Oceanography – Scientific study of the ocean
- Oceanology – Scientific study of the ocean
- Odontology – Scientific study of teeth
- Odonatology – Study of dragonflies and damselflies
- Oenology – Study of wine and winemaking
- Oikology – science of housekeeping
- Olfactology – study of the sense of smell
- Ombrology – study of rain
- Oncology – Branch of medicine dealing with, or specializing in, cancer
- Oneirology – Scientific study of dreams
- Onomasiology – Branch of linguistics concerned with how to express a given concept – study of nomenclature
- Onomastics – Study of proper names
- Ontology – Philosophical study of being – science of pure being; the nature of things
- Oology – Branch of ornithology studying bird eggs, nests and breeding behavior
- Ophiology, also known as ophidiology – Branch of herpetology that studies snakes
- Ophthalmology – Field of medicine treating eye disorders
- Optics – Branch of physics that studies light
- Optology – study of sight
- Optometry – Field of medicine treating eye disorders – science of examining the eyes
- Orbital mechanics – Field of classical mechanics concerned with the motion of spacecraft
- Orchidology – Scientific study of orchids
- Ornithology – Scientific study of birds
- Organology – Collection of tissues with similar functions (biology) – study of form, structure, development, and functions of plant or animal organs
- Organology – Science of musical instruments and their classifications (musicology) – study of musical instruments in relation to history, culture, construction, acoustic properties and classification
- Orology, also known as Mountain research – Study of mountain environments
- Orthoepy – Correct pronunciation of a language
- Orthography – Set of conventions for written language
- Orthopterology – Study of grasshoppers and related insects
- Oryctology – mineralogy or paleontology
- Osmics – scientific study of smells
- Osmology – study of smells and olfactory processes
- Osphresiology – study of the sense of smell
- Osteology – Scientific study of bones
- Otology – Branch of medicine for the ear
- Otorhinolaryngology – Medical specialty of the head and neck

== P ==
- Paedology – Study of children's behavior and development
- Paidonosology – study of children's diseases; pediatrics
- Palaeoanthropology – Study of ancient humans
- Palaeobiology – Study of organic evolution using fossils
- Palaeoclimatology – Study of changes in ancient climate
- Palaeoichthyology – study of ancient fish
- Palaeolimnology – Scientific study of ancient lakes and streams
- Palaeontology – Study of life before the Holocene epoch
- Palaeopedology – Discipline studying soils of the past eras
- Paleobotany – Study of organic evolution of plants based on fossils
- Paleo-osteology – study of ancient bones
- Paleoseismology – Study of earthquakes that happened in the past
- Palynology – Study of pollen and other acid-resistant microoscopic organic material
- Papyrology – Scientific study of ancient manuscripts
- Paradoxology – Logically self-contradictory statement – study of paradoxes
- Parapsychology – Study of paranormal and psychic phenomena
- Parasitology – Study of parasites, their hosts, and the relationship between them
- Paroemiology – study of proverbs
- Parthenology – study of virgins
- Particle physics – Study of subatomic particles and forces
- Pathology – Study of disease
- Pedagogics – Theory and practice of education
- Pedology – Study of soils in their natural environment
- Pelology – study of mud
- Penology – Subfield of criminology – study of crime and punishment
- Periodontology, also known as Periodontics – Field of dentistry
- Pestology – Scientific study of insects – science of pests
- Petrology – Study of rocks in geology
- Pharmacognosy – Study of drugs obtained from natural sources
- Pharmacology – Science of drugs and medications and their effects
- Pharology – Scientific study of lighthouses and signal lights
- Pharyngology – study of the throat
- Phenology – Study of periodic events in biological life cycles
- Phenomenology – Philosophical method and schools of philosophy – study of phenomena
- Philology – Study of language in historical sources
- Philosophy – Study of general and fundamental questions – science of knowledge or wisdom
- Phoniatrics – Sudy and treatment of organs involved in speech production
- Phonetics – Study of how humans produce and perceive sounds
- Phonology – Study of sound organization in languages
- Photobiology – Scientific study of light's effect on living organisms
- Photonics – Technical applications of optics – study of photons
- Phraseology – Linguistic study of phrases
- Phycology – Branch of biology concerned with the study of algae
- Phylogenetics, also known as Phylogeny – Study of evolutionary relationships between organisms
- Physics – Scientific field of study
- Physiology – Science regarding functions in organisms or living systems
- Phytology, also known as Botany – Study of plant life
- Piscatology – study of fishes
- Pisteology – science or study of faith
- Planetary science, also known as Planetology – Science of planets and planetary systems
- Plumology – Study of feathers
- Plutology – political economy; study of wealth
- Pneumatics – Use of pressurised gas in mechanical systems – study of mechanics of gases
- Pneumonology – Study of respiratory diseases
- Podiatry, also known as Podology – Medicine branch focusing on the human lower extremities
- Political science – Scientific study of politics and social science
- Polemology – Multidisciplinary study of war
- Pomology – Study of fruits and their cultivation
- Pogonology – Hair on the chin, lower face and neck – study of beards
- Posology – Study of dosage of medicines
- Potamology – Study of rivers
- Pragmatics – Branch of linguistics and semiotics relating context to meaning
- Praxeology – Theory of human action
- Primatology – Scientific study of primates
- Proctology – Study of the structure and diseases of the anus, rectum, and sigmoid colon
- Protistology – Scientific discipline devoted to the study of protists – study of protists
- Proxemics – Study of human use of space and the effects that population density has on behavior
- Psephology – Quantitative scientific analysis of elections and balloting (within political science) – study of election results and voting trends
- Pseudology – art or science of lying
- Pseudoptics – study of optical illusions
- Psychobiology – Neuroscience of behaviour
- Psychogenetics – Study of genetic-environment interactions influencing behaviour – study of internal or mental states
- Psychognosy – study of mentality, personality or character
- Psycholinguistics – Study of relations between psychology and language
- Psychology – Study of mental functions and behaviors
- Psychopathology – Scientific study of mental disorders
- Psychophysics – Branch of knowledge relating physical stimuli and psychological perception
- Pteridology – Class of vascular plants – study of ferns
- Pterylology – study of distribution of feathers on birds
- Punnology – study of puns
- Pyretology – study of fevers
- Pyrgology – study of towers
- Pyroballogy – study of artillery
- Pyrography – Art or decoration made from burn marks – study of woodburning
- Pyrotechnics – Science of creating combustibles and explosives for entertainment – study of combustion through fire or explosions

== Q ==
- Quantum computing – Computer hardware technology that uses quantum mechanics – the exploitation of collective properties of quantum states, such as superposition and entanglement, to perform computation.
- Quantum mechanics – Description of physical properties at the atomic and subatomic scale – a fundamental theory in physics which describes nature at the smallest scales of energy levels of atoms and subatomic particles
- Quantum physics – Description of physical properties at the atomic and subatomic scale – the study of matter and energy at the most fundamental level
- Queer theory – Field of critical theory – study of issues related to sexual orientation and gender identity
- Quinology – study of quinine.

== R ==
- Radiobiology – Study of effects of radiation on living tissues – study of the scientific principles, mechanisms, and effects of the interaction of ionizing radiation with living matter
- Radiochemistry – Chemistry of radioactive materials – study of ordinary chemical reactions under radioactive circumstances
- Radiology – Medical specialty for imaging procedures
- Rheology – Study of the flow of matter, primarily in a fluid state
- Rheumatology – Medical speciality of inflammatory diseases
- Rhinology – Study of the nose and sinuses
- Rhochrematics – science of inventory management and the movement of products
- Robotics – Design, construction, use, and application of robots
- Rodentology – Study of rodents
- Runology – Study of Runic alphabets

== S ==
- Sarcology – study of fleshy parts of the body
- Scatology – Study of faeces – study of excrement or obscene literature
- Schematonics – art of using gesture to express tones
- Sciagraphy – Study of perspective shadow projection – art of shading
- Scientific modelling – Scientific activity that produces models – study of application of models to understand a particular problem
- Scientific programming – Language for controlling a computer – study of programming
- Scripophily – Study and collection of stock and bond certificates
- Sedimentology – Study of natural sediments and their formation processes
- Seismology – Scientific study of earthquakes and propagation of elastic waves through a planet
- Selenodesy – Study of the surface and shape of the Moon
- Selenology – Structure and composition of the Moon – study of the Moon
- Semantics – Study of meaning in language
- Semantology – science of meanings of words
- Semasiology – Subfield of linguistic semantics
- Semiology – Study of signs – study of signs and signals
- Semiotics – Study of signs
- Serology – Scientific study of serum and other bodily fluids
- Sexology – Scientific study of human sexuality
- Siderology – study of iron and its alloys, including steel
- Significs – Linguistic and philosophical term – science of meaning
- Silvics – Practice of controlling forests for timber production – study of tree's life
- Sindonology – Scientific analysis of the Shroud.of Turin
- Sinology – Area studies focused on China
- Sitology – Expert in nutrition and malnutrition – dietetics
- Sociobiology – Subdiscipline of biology regarding social behavior – study of biological basis of human behaviour
- Socioeconomics – Branch of sociology – study of the relationship between economy and society
- Sociolinguistics – Study of how society affects language
- Sociology – Scientific study of human society and relationships
- Solid mechanics – Branch of mechanics concerned with solid materials and their behaviors
- Somatology – Branch of anthropology that studies the physical development of the human species – science of substances
- Snow hydrology – Field of snow science concerning its composition and dispersion
- Spectrology – Study involving matter and electromagnetic radiation
- Spectroscopy – Study involving matter and electromagnetic radiation – study of spectra
- Speleology – Science of cave and karst systems
- Spermology – Reproductive structure in plants – study of seeds
- Sphagnology – study of peat moss
- Sphygmology – Study of the pulse
- Splanchnology – Study of the visceral organs
- Spongology – study of sponges
- Stasiology – study of political parties
- Statics – Branch of mechanics concerned with balance of forces in nonmoving systems
- Stellar astronomy – Study of stars and stellar evolution
- Stemmatics, also known as Stemmatology – Identification of textual variants – study of relationships between text
- Stereochemistry – Subdiscipline of chemistry – study of chemistry of the relative spatial arrangement of atoms that form the structure of molecules and their manipulation.
- Stoichiology – science of elements of animal tissues
- Stomatology – Study of oral medicine – study of the mouth
- Storiology – study of folk tales
- Stratigraphy – Study of rock layers and their formation
- Stratography – art of leading an army
- Stylometry – Study of writing style – studying literature by means of statistical analysis
- Suicidology – Scientific study of suicide and self-destructive behaviors
- Supramolecular chemistry – Branch of chemistry – study of the chemistry of assembled molecular sub-units
- Symbology – Something that represents an idea, process, or physical entity – study of symbols
- Symptomatology – Indications of a specific illness, including psychiatric – study of symptoms of illness
- Synecology – Associated populations of species in a given area – study of ecological communities
- Synectics – Thought process for making the strange familiar and the familiar strange – study of processes of invention
- Syntax – System responsible for combining morphemes into complex structures – study of sentence structure
- Syphilology – Sexually transmitted infection – study of syphilis
- Systematics – Branch of biology – study of the diversification of living forms, both past and present
- Systems science – Study of the nature of systems – study of systems

== T ==
- Taxidermy – Stuffing and mounting dead animals for display – art of curing and stuffing animals
- Taxonomy – Science of classifying organisms
- Tectonics – Process of evolution of Earth's crust
- Teleology – Thinking in terms of destiny or purpose – study of final causes; analysis in terms of purpose
- Telmatology – Branch of physical geography concerned with the study of wetlands
- Tempestology – The study of cyclones, hurricanes and similar extreme weather events
- Teratology – Study of developmental anomalies
- Terrestrial ecology – Study of terrestrial ecosystems and the biotic and abiotic things that occupy them.
- Teuthology – Study of cephalopods
- Textology – Identification of textual variants – study of the production of texts
- Thalassography – science of the seas and gulfs
- Thanatology – Scientific study of death and its aspects
- Thaumatology – The study of miracles – study of miracles
- Theology – Study of the nature of deities and religious beliefs - study of religion
- Theoretical computer science – Subfield of computer science and mathematics
- Theriogenology – Veterinary specialty concerning reproduction
- Thermodynamics – Physics of heat, work, and temperature
- Thermokinematics – study of motion of heat
- Thermology – study of heat
- Therology – Study of mammals
- Thremmatology – science of breeding domestic animals and plants
- Threpsology – science of nutrition
- Tidology – study of tides
- Timbrology – study of postage stamps
- Tocology – Medical specialty encompassing two subspecialties – obstetrics; midwifery
- Tokology – Medical specialty encompassing two subspecialties – study of childbirth
- Tonetics – Use of pitch to distinguish lexical or grammatical meaning
- Topography – Study of the forms of land surfaces in earth
- Topology – Branch of mathematics – study of places and their natural features
- Toponymy, also known as Toponymics – Study of place names
- Toxicology – Study of substances harmful to living organisms
- Traumatology – Medicine branch – study of wounds and their effects
- Tribology – Science of rubbing surfaces
- Trichology – Study of the hair and scalp
- Trophology – Science of nutrition
- Tsiganology – study of gypsies
- Turbology – study of tornadoes
- Typhlology – study of blindness and the blind
- Typography – Art of arranging type – art and technique of arranging type
- Typology – System of classification – study of types of things

== U ==
- Uranography – Part of astronomy concerned with mapping of stars
- Uranology – Science of the heavens (historical)
- Urbanology – Study dealing with specialized problems of cities
- Urenology – study of rust molds
- Urogynecology – Sub-specialty of urology and gynecology
- Urology – Medical specialty on the urinary and reproductive systems

== V ==
- Vaccinology – Science of vaccine development and production
- Valeology – study of healthy living
- Venereology – Branch of medicine dealing with the study and treatment of sexually transmitted diseases
- Venology – The study of veins.
- Veterinary medicine – Branch of medicine for non-human animals
- Vexillography – Art and practice of designing flags – the art and practice of designing flags
- Vexillology – Study of flags
- Victimology – Study of victimization
- Vinology – Study of wine and winemaking – scientific study of vines and winemaking
- Virology – Study of viruses
- Vitaminology – The study of vitamins.
- Vitrics – study, art and technology of glassy materials; glassware
- Volcanology – Study of volcanoes

== W ==
- Webology – Academic journal on the World Wide Web – The study of the World Wide Web.

== X ==
- Xenobiology – Science of synthetic life forms – study of biological systems which do not exist in nature
- Xylography – Broad term for woodblock printing techniques
- Xylology – Science of wood

== Y ==
- Youth Studies – Interdisciplinary academic field – the study of the development, history, culture, psychology, and politics of youth

== Z ==
- Zenography – The study of the planet Jupiter
- Zooarchaeology – Analysis of animal remains found in archaeological sites
- Zoochemistry – study of chemistry of animals
- Zoogeography – Science of the geographic distribution of animal species
- Zoogeology – study of fossil animal remains
- Zoology – Scientific study of animals
- Zoonomy – study of animal physiology
- Zoonosology – study of animal diseases
- Zoopathology – Study and diagnosis of disease in animals
- Zoophysics – Study of physics relating to structure and function of animal organs and bodies.
- Zoophysiology – study of physiology of animals
- Zoophytology – study of plant-like animals
- Zoosemiotics – Study of the use of signs among animals – study of animal communication
- Zootaxy – Scientific classification of animals.
- Zootechnics – Science of managing domestic or captive animals
- Zygology – science of joining and fastening
- Zymology – Study of fermentation and its uses
- Zymurgy – Applied chemistry of fermentation processes
- Zythology – Study of beer and beer-brewing.

== See also ==
- List of words ending in ology
- List of sciences
- Science
- Outline of academic disciplines
