= Perfect Potion =

Perfect Potion Products Pvt Ltd, founded in 1991, is a privately owned Australian manufacturer and retailer of organic skincare and aromatherapy products.

== History ==
Perfect Potion was founded in 1991 by aromatherapists Salvatore Battaglia and Carolyn Stubbin. In late 1980s Battaglia began the development of Perfect Potion under the label ‘The Garden Party.’ In 1991 Battaglia opened the first official Perfect Potion store in the Elizabeth Arcade, Brisbane.

In 2000, the company opened a Therapeutic Goods Administration (TGA) licensed manufacturing premises and head office in the Brisbane suburb of Virginia. In 2008, Perfect Potion began a joint venture with Japanese national Kiyo Yamamoto establishing Perfect Potion Japan. The first store was opened in Kyoto in 2008.

== Awards ==
The company has been a recipient of awards for its retail and business achievements. These include:

- 2004 National Retail Association Award for The Small Business Award
- 2005 finalist for Ernst & Young Entrepreneur of the Year
- 2005 Australian Institute of Management Owner/Manager of the Year
- 2017 Queensland Premiers Export Awards finalists, manufacturing section
- 2018 National Retail Association Customer Experience Champion of the Year
- 2019 3-Star ecoBiz Partnership with CCIQ EcoBiz Queensland

== Publications ==
Battaglia wrote and published The Complete Guide to Aromatherapy in 1995. The book has been translated into both Korean and Japanese. The second edition was published in 2006. The third edition, The Complete Guide to Aromatherapy 3rd Edition Volume 1 - Foundations & Materia Medica, was released in 2018.
