= Coniology =

Study of atmospheric dust and its effects

Coniology or koniology (from Greek κόνις, konis or κονίᾱ, koniā, "dust"; and -λογία, -logia) is the study of atmospheric dust and its effects. Samples of dust are often collected by a device called a coniometer. Coniology refers to the observation and contemplation of dust in an atmosphere, but the study of dust may also be applied to dust in space, therefore connecting it to a variety of atmospheric and extraterrestrial topics.

== Earth ==
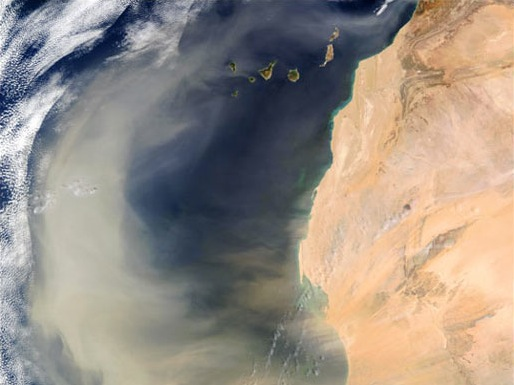
A dust storm traveling from the Sahara Desert over the Atlantic Ocean

Dust in Earth's atmosphere comes from both natural and anthropogenic causes. The process of which dust enters Earth's atmosphere naturally can be attributed to the Aeolian process where winds erode Earth's surface and consequently carry particles from the ground into the atmosphere via suspension, whereas anthropogenic dust may be due to human activities such as farming and creating air pollutants. The solid dust particulates and atmospheric moisture combined are suspended in the air which are both natural and anthropogenic are referred to as aerosols. The Sahara Desert is one of the biggest contributors in the creation of atmospheric dust as the winds carry and deposit dust and particulates across the planet.

The effect dust has on living organisms is both observed positively and negatively. The dust that is carried by wind from the Sahara desert can travel as far as the Caribbean and South America. This dust carries nutrients which further supports the ecosystems in the Caribbean, and those on the South American continent. Furthermore, nutrients in dust can be carried by winds which reach all across the globe. On the other hand, dust can also be more harmful for an ecosystem depending on what it carries. Research conducted by the senior geologist at the U.S. Geological Survey Center for Coastal Geology, Gene Shinn, revealed a correlation of decline in coral reefs with increased harmful pathogens to coral transported by dust from the Sahara to the Caribbean, coupled with an increasing global ocean temperature.

Atmospheric dust, both natural and anthropogenic, has also been shown to affect humans. One of the biggest contributing factors that the effect atmospheric dust has on humans is health, more specifically respiratory health. Barbados and Trinidad have seen a rise in asthma in their population and one of the speculated causes is an influx of dust being carried over the Atlantic from the Sahara desert. Certain particulates, or particulate matter PM have led to health issues among humans such as lung disease and cardiovascular disease.

== Moon ==
The study of dust and its effect is not only applied to the Earth, but also the Moon. One NASA mission sent a spacecraft to study the Moon's atmosphere, this spacecraft was called LADEE. LADEE's mission revealed to scientist how different the Moon's atmosphere is compared to the Earth, which may give insight on other celestial bodies and their atmospheric composition. The Moons atmosphere is very tenuous and creates an atmosphere with minimal dust presence. The Moon's thin atmosphere is the result of solar waves that deliver hydrogen and helium to its exosphere, and gasses of argon and helium being released from the lunar rocks. Of the most abundant elements in the Moon's atmosphere, helium, argon and neon, will all be present but at different amounts in the atmosphere depending on where and how long the Sun's rays hit the Moon.

== Other celestial bodies ==
Space is known for its vast emptiness; however, there is an enormous amount of dust in space, whether it be on comets, moons, planets, or nebulae. The Herschel Space Observatory provided scientist with data about how celestial bodies formed in space, while also making new discoveries pertaining to dust in space. Dust in space, or cosmic dust create mass required for the formation of all celestial bodies like planets and stars. From the research gathered by the Herschel Space Observatory, Supernovae, or the massive explosion of a star that occurs at the end of a stars life, was the biggest contributing factor of ejecting dust and elements into space essentially creating the make up for matter in our universe.

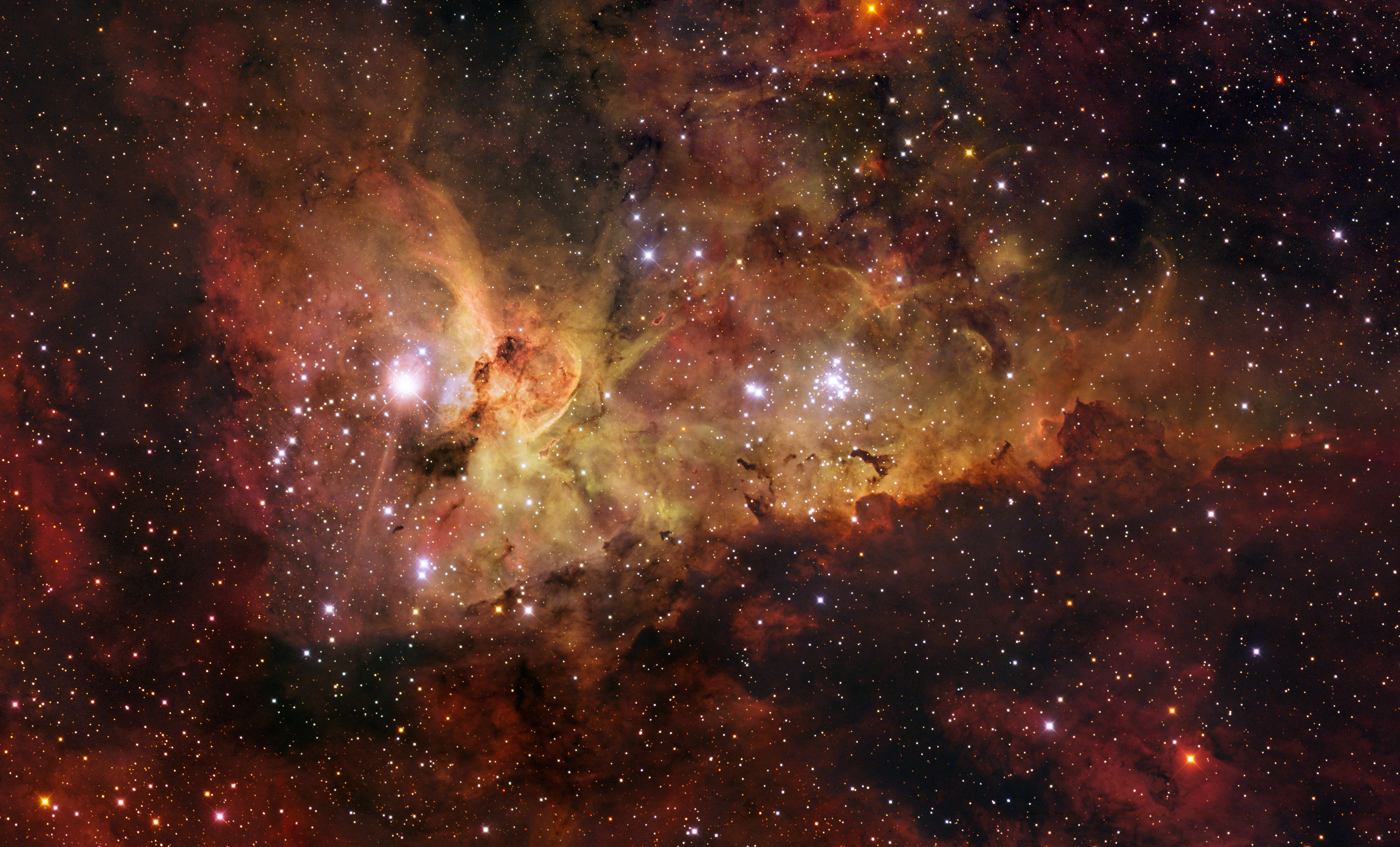
A section of the Carina Nebula

When attempting to study space, cosmic dust would tend to hinder the scientists attempting to observe the celestial bodies in space. However, cosmic dust went from a hindrance, to a new and important aspect of scientific study. The Herschel Space Observatory used far reaching infrared equipment which revealed light being emitted from cosmic dust and gasses. This infrared technology allowed the Herschel Space Observatory and scientist to see more objects in space that emit heat at lower temperatures, which in turn allows more celestial bodies to be seen when they would not have been without the advanced infrared technologies.

The Stardust spacecraft developed our understanding of cosmic dust. Stardust's mission was to collect samples of cosmic dust from the Wild-2 comet. The reason why this mission is significant is that it will not only help understand the properties of dust in space, but also that it was the first mission to collect dust from a comet and return it to Earth.

== Famous Coniologists ==
- Chia C. Wang, Director of the Aerosol Science Research Center at National Sun Yat-sen University, Taiwan, known for her work on air quality and aerosol impacts
- John Aitken, built the first apparatus to measure the number of dust and fog particles in the atmosphere, a koniscope
- Paul J. Crutzen, studied the effects of aerosols and dust on climate and the ozone layer, won a Nobel Prize
- Veerabhadran Ramanathan, Known for his work on atmospheric aerosols, including their impact on climate and the phenomenon of atmospheric brown clouds.
- Susan Solomon, prominent atmospheric scientist who has studied the effects of particles and aerosols on the ozone layer and climate.
- Vilhelm Bjerknes, pioneer in meteorology who laid the groundwork for modern weather forecasting and atmospheric studies
- Inez Fung, renowned atmospheric scientist who has extensively studied the role of aerosols, including dust, in climate systems and their interactions with the carbon cycle.
