= Aeropalynology =

Study of pollen and spores in Earths atmosphere

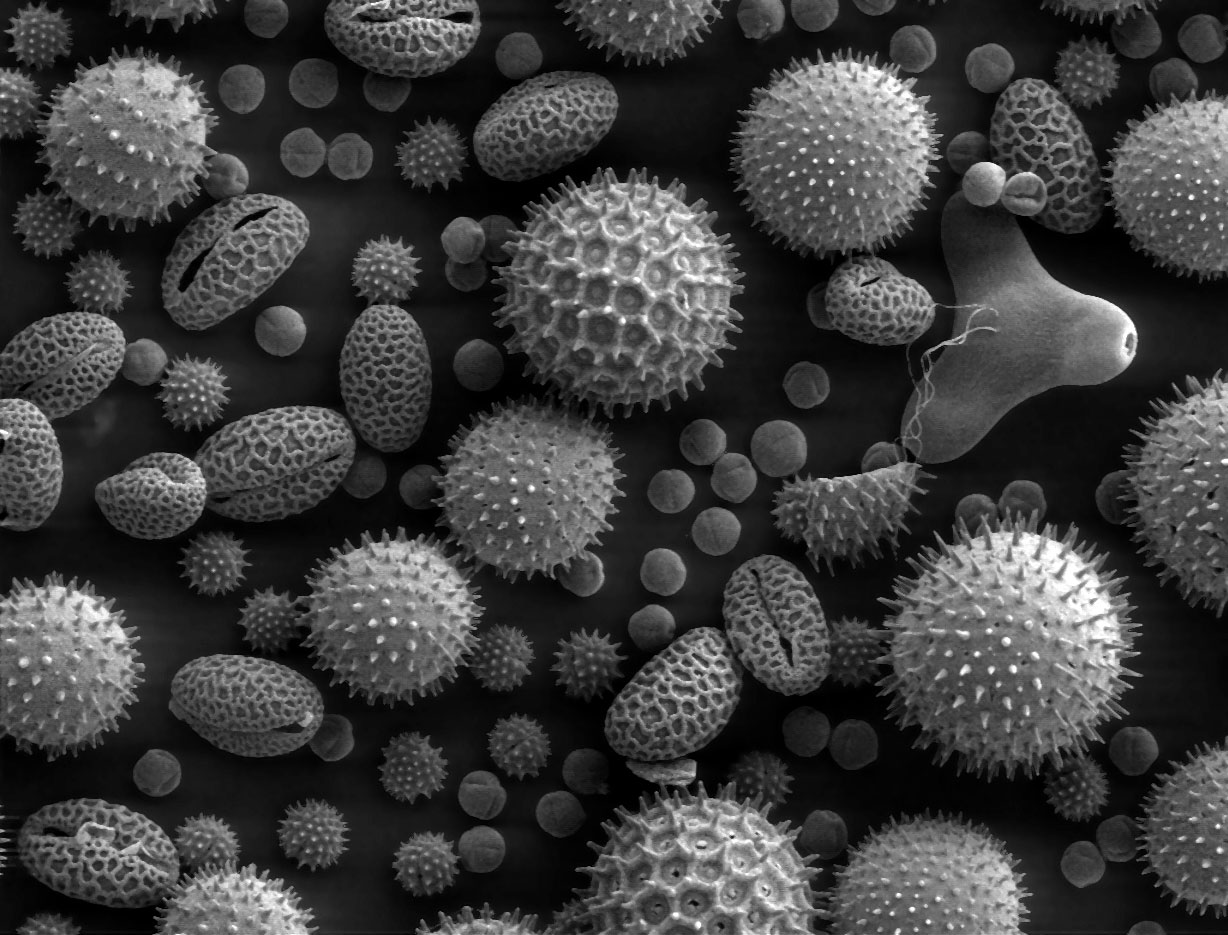
Various pollen grains from a variety of plant species.

Aeropalynology is a branch of palynology that is the study of pollen, spores and other bioparticles in the Earth's atmosphere. This study includes how theses particles spread, deposit and effect human systems.

== Overview ==
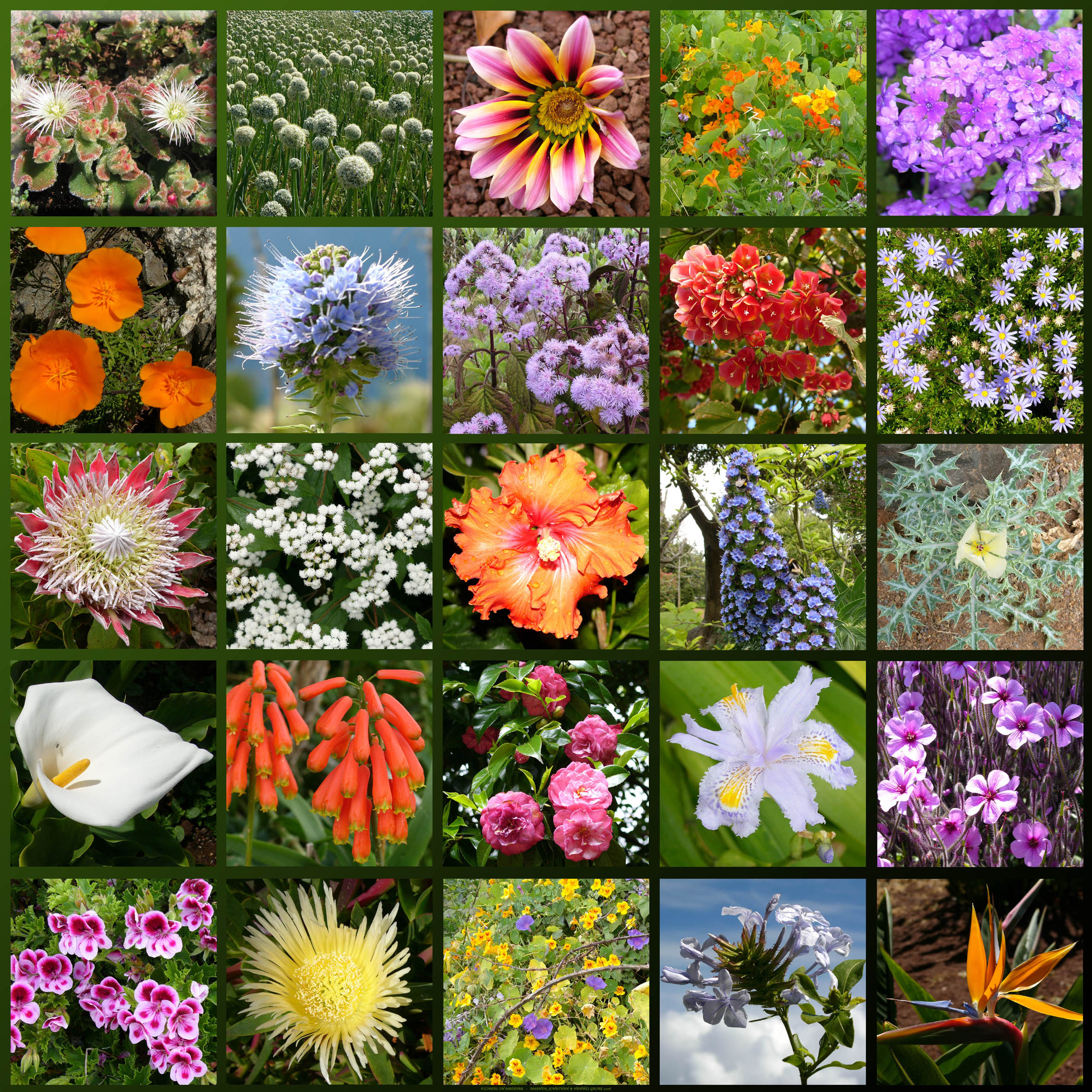
Various species of flowers.

Allergic diseases are among the most common chronic disorders across the entire world with more than 300 million people suffering from allergies. The most common cause of allergies include pollen, fungal spores, dust mites, insect debris, epithelia cells from animals, etc.

During certain times of the year, flowering plants will bloom more often and load the atmosphere with pollen periodically, but the time of year differs from place to place and differs depending on the geography.

== Importance ==
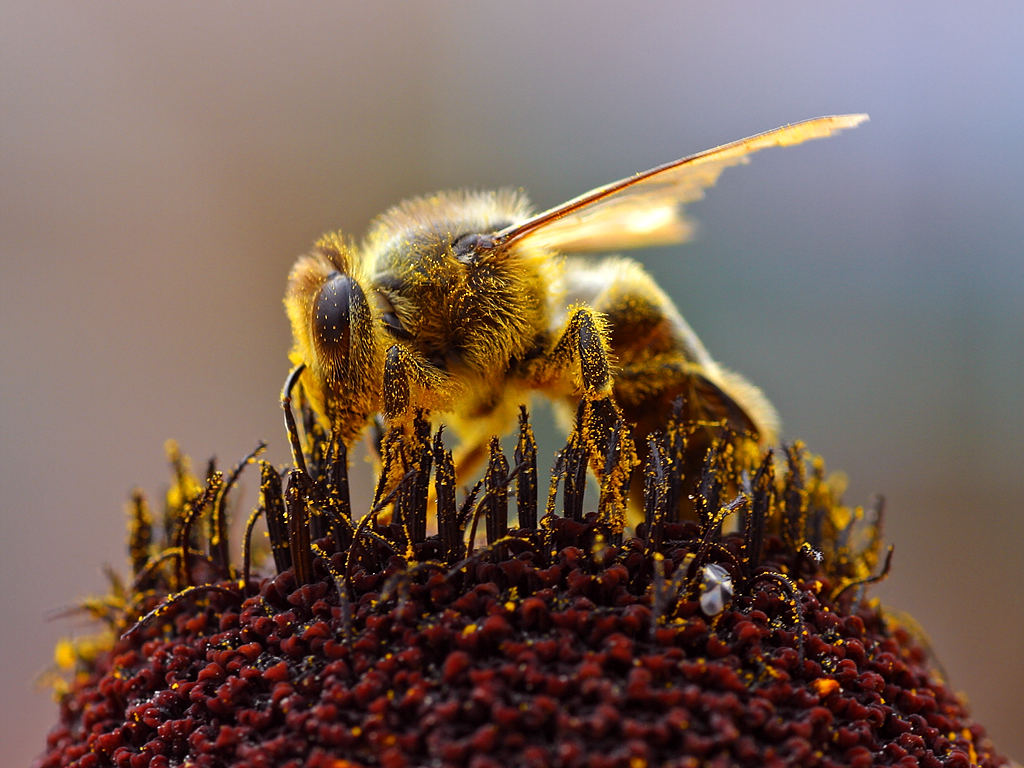
Pollen from flowers cover this bee.

Nearly all of the world's seed plants and cone-bearing plants such as pine trees need to be pollinated and is vital to a plants reproductive cycle. It is vital to study pollen and the animals that pollinate them, since nearly 80% of the worlds crop plants require pollination by animals such as bees. Globally, pollination services are likely worth more than 3 trillion dollars. Flowering plants also produce breathable oxygen, sequester carbon dioxide, purify water and hold soil in place.

Pollen due to its abundance and resistance to being destroyed even by rocks are commonly preserved as fossils. This allows paleobotanists to identify which species of plants were in the area at specific times and in what abundance and reconstruct past climates millions of years ago.

=== Human health ===
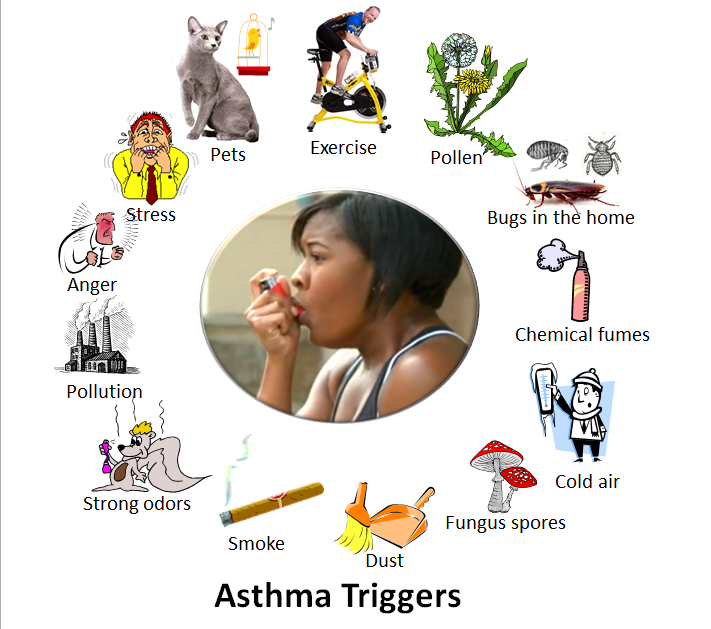
Various triggers of asthma including pollen, fungal spores, chemical fumes, smoking and pollution.

Pollen has a significant impact on the health of people with over 300 million people worldwide having allergies and related diseases caused by pollen such as hay fever or asthma. Asthma is a chronic inflammation of the airway causing a shortness in breath, wheezing, coughing and tightness of the chest. The main cause of asthma is pollen. This seriously effects patients with asthma significantly effecting the quality of life and causing heavy financial burdens. Proteins and glycoproteins from the pollen interact with the human immune system to elicit an immune response.

This field is also important for the study of allergies and the spread of disease among people, animals and agriculture.
