= Aromachology =

Study of the influence of odors on human behavior

Aromachology is the study of the influence of odors on human behavior and to examine the relationship between feelings and emotions. Those who practice aromachology are aromachologists. Aromachologists analyze emotions such as relaxation, exhilaration, sensuality, happiness and well-being brought about by odors stimulating the olfactory pathways in the brain and, in particular, the limbic system. Different wearers are thought to have unique physiological and psychological responses to scents, especially those not manufactured synthetically but based on real scents.

The word "aromachology" is derived from "aroma" and "physio-psychology", the latter being the study of aroma. This term was coined in 1989 by what is now the Sense of Smell Institute (SSI), a division of The Fragrance Foundation. The SSI defines aromachology as "a concept based on systematic, scientific data collected under controlled conditions". The term is defined as the scientifically observable influence of smell on emotions and moods. Consumers use aromachology to alleviate time pressures, for relaxation or stimulation and as a component of other activities that generate a feeling of well-being.

Although certain plants are known through studies in aromatherapy to have stimulating or relaxing effects, research on wider scopes of application for therapeutic purposes are still at an early stage. Aromachology devotees want to find out how psychological effects are transmitted from scent to the brain, as well as how positive behavioral effects can be induced by scent. Maria Lis-Bachin, author of Aromatherapy Science: a Guide for Healthcare Professionals, notes an overlap between the objectives of aromatherapy and those of aromachology. However, despite this apparent overlapping, academic authors believe that they are distinct branches of research and application, with each having its own research methods and directions.

The aims of aromachology are to "study the interrelationship of psychology and the latest in fragrance technology and to transmit through odor a variety of specific feelings (such as relaxation, exhilaration, sensuality, happiness and achievement) directly to the brain.

== Aromatherapy vs. Aromachology ==
The history of aromatherapy goes back to Ancient Egypt. People for years have used essential oils to treat their psychological and physical well-being. In Ancient Egypt, people used essential oils for cosmetic and medicinal products. Civilizations from around the globe also used aromatherapy for therapeutic purposes. The term aromatherapy dates from the 20th century when French chemist Jean-Maurice Gattefosse rediscovered the healing powers of lavender's essential oil by trying to relieve a severe burn. Aromatherapy requires the incorporation of essential oils and plant-based essentials for therapeutic and holistic process assuring the well-being of the mind and body.

On the other hand, aromachology is the term The Fragrance Foundation and the Sense of Smell Institute, both based in New York, assigned in 1989 to the concern about the scents and the psyche behavior because of odors. Aromachology is a relatively new science that explores positive feelings induced by odors far from any holistic or healing process. The term covers both natural and synthetic scents. The term aromachology is sometimes mistaken by companies for several other terms such as "essential oils" or "aromatherapy" as marketing phrases. The products shouldn't be labeled other than "aromachology" because they do not offer healing or holistic benefits.

== Aromachology and human behavior ==
Studies have been conducted to show that those parts of the brain which govern alertness and concentration can be influenced positively or negatively by the olfactory substances used. Jasmine in a testing room enhanced the problem-solving cognitive skills of participants and also led to them demonstrating more interest and motivation for the task at hand. A combination of eucalyptus, peppermint oil and ethanol has been shown to improve cognitive performance, and after a monotonous stressful task experimental subjects were shown to demonstrate greater motivation after being exposed to a blend of peppermint, bergamot, sandalwood and lavender.

A Journal of Society of Cosmetic Chemists of Japan in 1992 realized a study to show how humans behave based on the scent they are exposed to. On the study, the effect of odor on cardiac response patterns was investigated on human subjects during a period of two-stimulus paradigm in a simple reaction time task. During the experiment changes in the cardiac response pattern were obvious and heart rate deceleration reflecting the process of anticipation or attention. Olfactory stimulation was provided to the subjects with different aromatic air samples with a 5-second rest period, followed by a 20-second olfactory stimulus period. It was concluded that the odor of lemon, traditionally thought to be stimulative, had the effect of activating anticipation or attention process. The effect of activating the anticipation or attention process was stronger when the odor intensity was more concentrated. On the other hand, the rose odor initially was thought to be sedative, had the effect of suppressing that process.

== Mechanisms of action ==
When odors activate the olfactory pathways that lead to the limbic portion of the brain they trigger the release of neurotransmitters that affect the brain and mental state of the individual in a variety of ways. Stimuli transmitted to the limbic system cannot be consciously blocked, so all olfactory stimuli influence our emotions. Smell has not been studied in as much depth as vision and hearing. The brain is able to process small differences in smell and the sense of smell may last longer in the aging process than sight and hearing.

== Commercial application of aromachology ==
From the point of view of creating a scent for the body, a number of aromachology practitioners and small companies interested in aromachology are focused on creating bespoke perfumes for individuals who are less interested in purchasing the same fragrances that every other person is wearing and more inclined to wearing a perfume tailored precisely to their own preferences, memories and scent matches. Some cosmetic brands such as Shiseido and Décléor are devoting substantial efforts to the task of finding out the beneficial properties of aromas on our sense of well-being and health. Shiseido currently has a skincare line called "The Skincare" that uses aromachology in their products. Broader applications for aromachology are found in industries that introduce scent into products other than cosmetics or perfumes. Aromachology is considered to also encompass scents introduced to home fragrances, textiles, drawer liners and odor reducers for the home environment.

== Aromachologists ==
Aromachologists work with essential oils for their aromatic and physical effects and are experts in the way essential oils can be blended to create "behavioral fragrances" to establish the positive effects of aromas on human behavior including feelings and emotions. Pleasant aromas cause people to linger longer, a boon to retail stores, museums, spas and casinos. Pleasant smells have been shown to improve productivity, and improve physical performance, with athletes running faster, doing more pushups, and experiencing shorter recovery time after an extensive workout when the room was scented with either peppermint or lemon.

By blending specific smells, an aromachologist can create a more restful environment and improve health conditions. A study in 1987 showed that the smells found in nutmeg oil, maize extract, neroli oil, valerian oil, myristici, soelemcin and elemicin reduce stress in humans as well as reducing stress-related high blood pressure. The Mind Lab, an independent consultancy in the UK, studies the odor of a building as part of research on the brain's responses to stimuli. Real estate brokers have been recommending to their clients to have smells of freshly baked cookies or the aroma of coffee in the house when it is being presented to potential buyers to create a sense of home. By bottling and releasing appropriate smells to evoke comfort, safety and joy, an owner may be able to accelerate the sale of a house.

Worker productivity can be enhanced by improving the quality of air in a building, not just by removing the negative pollutants, but also by introducing olfactory stimulation through ventilation or air conditioning systems in order to get a mix of ventilated air and odor. It is necessary to ensure that the dosage is such that the odor is not excessive and should be kept just above the detection level. Also, these olfactory substances are very different from perfume and should instead replicate the smell of natural outdoor air. Jasmine is used as a sleep aid and the scent of vanilla is useful for those who want to cut the craving for sweets after lunch.
