= Telmatology =

Branch of physical geography concerned with the study of wetlands

Telmatology is a branch of physical geography that studies wetlands, such as marshes or swamps.
