= Aromatherapy =

Pseudoscientific alternative medicine practice

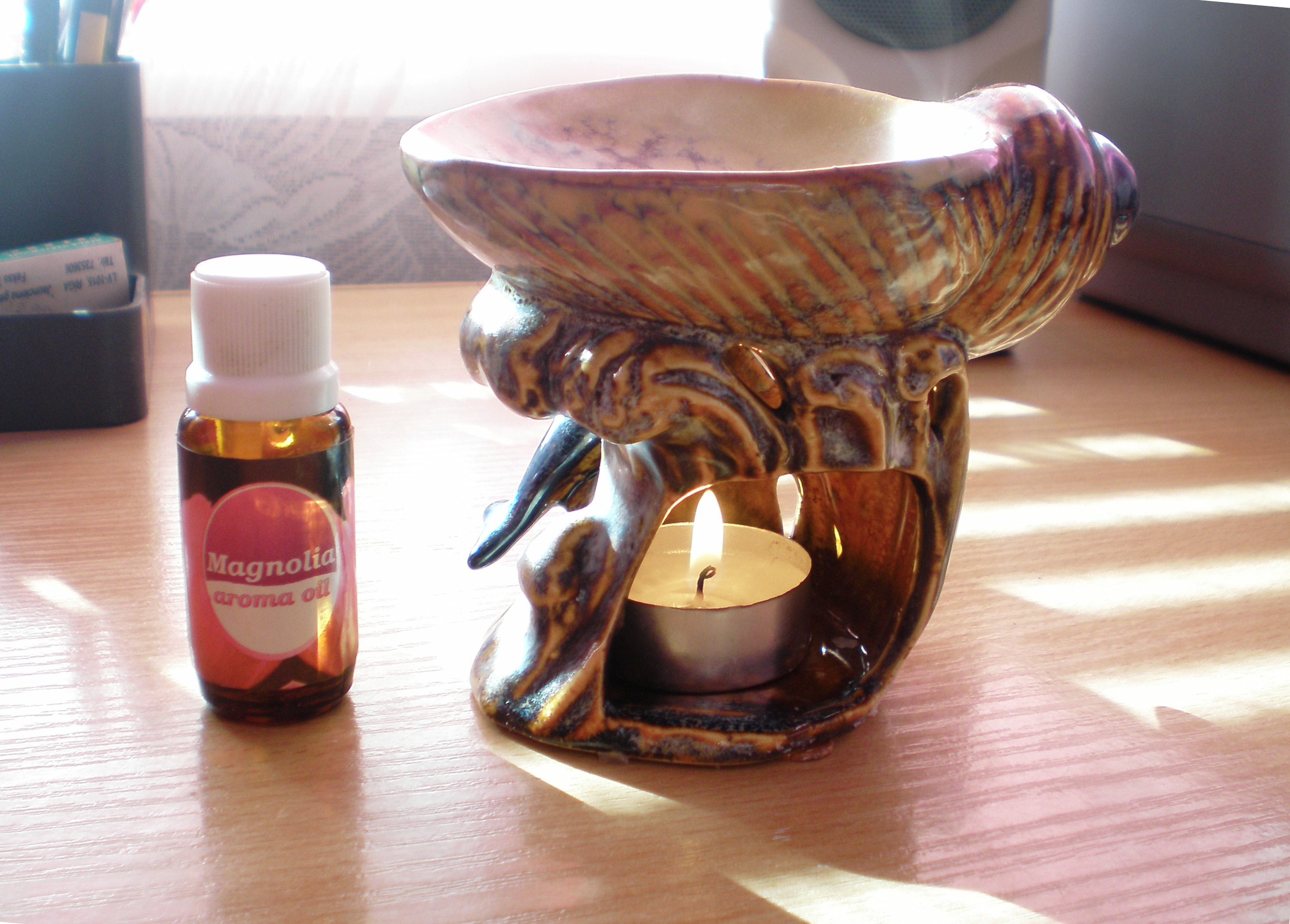
- A stylized diffuser and a bottle of essential oil

Alternative therapy
- MeSH: D019341

Aromatherapy is a practice based on the use of aromatic materials, including essential oils and other aroma compounds, with claims for improving psychological well-being. It is used as a complementary therapy or as a form of alternative medicine, and typically is used via inhalation and not by ingestion.

Fragrances used in aromatherapy are not approved as prescription drugs in the United States. Although there is insufficient medical evidence that aromatherapy can prevent, treat or cure any disease, aromatherapy is used by some people with diseases, such as cancer, to provide general well-being and relief from pain, nausea or stress. People may use blends of essential oils as a topical application, massage, inhalation, or water immersion.

Essential oils comprise hundreds to thousands of aromatic constituents, like terpinoids and phenylpropanoids, and to sufficiently research the pharmacological effects of essential oil constituents, each isolated constituent in the selected essential oil would have to be studied.

== History ==
Oils and the belief that they had healing properties, along with other beliefs of the time, are described by Dioscorides in his De Materia Medica, written in the 1st century A.D. Distilled cedarwood oil was used by the ancient Egyptians, and the process of distilling essential oils like rose essence was refined by the 11th century Persian scholar Ibn Sina. Hildegard of Bingen used distilled lavender oil for medicinal treatments in the 12th century, and by the 15th century, oils were commonly distilled from various plant sources.

In the era of modern medicine, the name "aromatherapy" first appeared in print in 1937 in a French book on the subject: Aromathérapie: Les Huiles Essentielles, Hormones Végétales by René-Maurice Gattefossé, a chemist. An English version was published in 1993. Jean Valnet, a French surgeon, pioneered the supposed medicinal uses of essential oils, which he used as antiseptics in the treatment of wounded soldiers during World War II.

== Choice and purchase ==
Aromatherapy products, and essential oils in particular, may be regulated differently depending on their intended use. Products that are marketed with a therapeutic use in the US are regulated by the US Food and Drug Administration (FDA); products with a cosmetic use must meet safety requirements, regardless of their source. The US Federal Trade Commission (FTC) regulates any aromatherapy advertising claims.

There are no standards for determining the quality of essential oils in the United States; while the term "therapeutic grade" is in use, it does not have a regulatory meaning. Analysis using gas chromatography and mass spectrometry has been used to identify bioactive compounds in essential oils. These techniques are able to measure the levels of components to a few parts per billion. This does not make it possible to determine whether each component is natural or whether a poor oil has been "improved" by the addition of synthetic aromachemicals, but the latter is often signalled by the minor impurities present.

== Effectiveness ==
There is no clinical evidence that aromatherapy can prevent or cure any disease, although it may be useful for managing symptoms. Evidence for the efficacy of aromatherapy in treating medical conditions is poor, with a particular lack of studies employing rigorous methodology. In 2015, the Australian Government's Department of Health published the results of a review of alternative therapies that sought to determine if any were suitable for being covered by health insurance; no clear evidence for the effectiveness of aromatherapy was found.

Several systematic reviews have studied the clinical effectiveness of aromatherapy in respect to pain management in labor, the treatment of post-operative nausea and vomiting, managing challenging behaviors in people suffering from dementia, and symptom relief in cancer to mixed results. According to the US National Cancer Institute, no studies of aromatherapy in cancer treatment have been published in a peer-reviewed scientific journal. Results are mixed for other studies. Some showed improved sleep, anxiety, mood, nausea, and pain, while others showed no change in symptoms.

== Safety concerns ==
Aromatherapy carries several risks of adverse effects; combined with the lack of evidence of its therapeutic benefit, the practice is of questionable worth.

=== Skin irritation and sensitisation ===
Many studies have explored the concerns that essential oils are highly concentrated and can irritate the skin when used in undiluted form, often referred to as neat application. Therefore, they are normally diluted with a carrier oil for topical application such as jojoba oil, olive oil, sweet almond oil or coconut oil. Phototoxic reactions may occur with many cold-pressed citrus peel oils such as lemon or lime.

Many essential oils have chemical components that are sensitisers (meaning that they will, after several uses, cause reactions on the skin and more so in the rest of the body). All cosmetic products and ingredients must meet the same safety requirements, regardless of their source. Chemical composition of essential oils could be affected by herbicides if the original plants are cultivated versus wild-harvested. Some oils can be toxic to some domestic animals, with cats being particularly prone. Most oils can be toxic to humans as well.

=== Endocrine-disrupting effects ===
A report on three different cases documented gynecomastia in prepubertal boys who were exposed to topical lavender and tea tree oils. The Aromatherapy Trade Council of the UK issued a rebuttal. Another article published by a different research group also documented three cases of gynecomastia in prepubertal boys who were exposed to topical lavender oil. Persistent exposure to lavender products may be associated with premature breast development in girls and "that chemicals in lavender oil and tea tree oil are potential endocrine disruptors with varying effects on receptors for two hormones – estrogen and androgen".

=== Poisoning ===
Essential oils can be toxic when ingested or absorbed internally. Doses as low as 2 ml have been reported to cause clinically significant symptoms and severe poisoning can occur after ingestion of as little as 4 ml. A few reported cases of toxic reactions like liver damage and seizures have occurred after ingestion of sage, hyssop, thuja and cedar oils. Accidental ingestion may happen when oils are not kept out of reach of children. As with any bioactive substance, an essential oil that may be safe for the general public could still pose hazards for pregnant and lactating people. Oils both ingested and applied to the skin can potentially have negative interactions with conventional medicine. For example, the topical use of methyl salicylate-heavy oils like wintergreen may cause bleeding in users taking the anticoagulant warfarin.

=== Bacterial contamination ===
In late 2021, an aromatherapy spray was recalled after it was found to be contaminated with Burkholderia pseudomallei, the bacterial agent that causes melioidosis, which led to four cases of the disease and two deaths.

== See also ==
- Aromachologist
- List of unproven and disproven cancer treatments
