= Webology =

Academic journal on the World Wide Web

- Discipline: Information Science
- Language: English
- Edited by: Alireza Noruzi

Publication details
- Publisher: Webology Center
- Frequency: Biannual

Standard abbreviations
- ISO 4: Webology

Indexing
- CODEN: Webology
- ISSN: 1735-188X
- LCCN: ZA4226.W42
- OCLC no.: 57390951

Links
- Journal homepage

Webology is an academic journal in English on the field of the World Wide Web.

== Abstracting and indexing ==
This journal is indexed by the following services:

- Scopus: Elsevier Bibliographic Databases 2006-2021 (discontinued)
- ProQuest
- EBSCO
- LISA: Library & Information Science Abstracts
- DOAJ - Directory of Open Access Journals (discontinued)
- Open J-Gate
- FRANCIS (discontinued)
- Web Citation Index
- Academic Journals Database
- China Education Publications Import & Export Corporation (CEPIEC)
