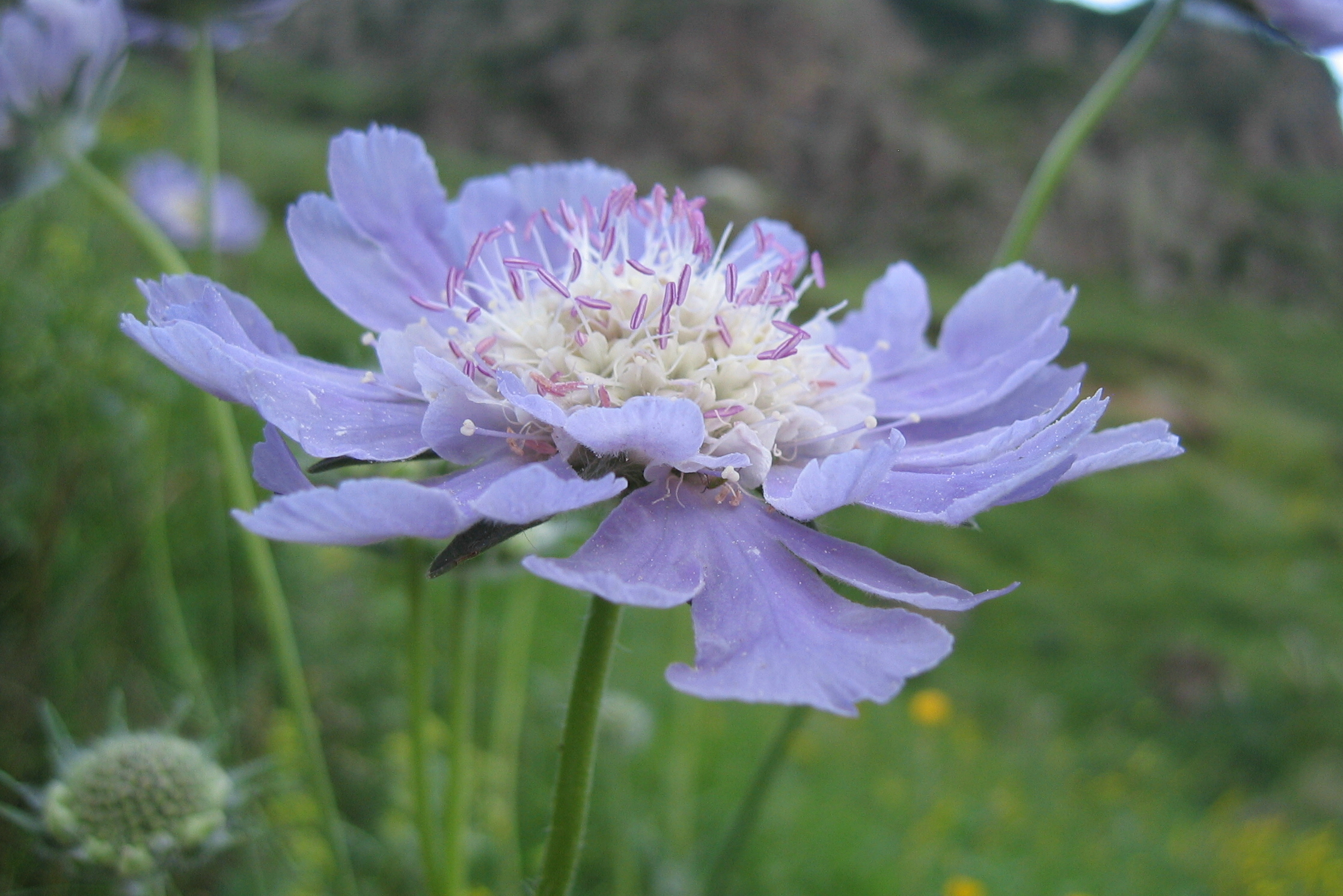
- Lomelosia caucasica (syn. Scabiosa caucasica)

Scientific classification
- Kingdom: Plantae
- Clade: Tracheophytes
- Clade: Angiosperms
- Clade: Eudicots
- Clade: Asterids
- Order: Dipsacales
- Family: Caprifoliaceae
- Genus: Lomelosia
- Species: L. caucasica

Binomial name
- Lomelosia caucasica (M.Bieb.) Greuter & Burdet

Synonyms
- Asterocephalus caucasicus (M.Bieb.) Spreng., Syst. Veg. ed. 16, 1: 381 (1824); Asterocephalus elegans Lag., Gen. Sp. Pl.: 8 (1816), nom. superfl.; Scabiosa caucasica M.Bieb., Fl. Taur.-Caucas. 1: 98 (1808); Sclerostemma caucasicum (M.Bieb.) Schott, K.P.J.Sprengel, Syst. Veg. 3: 84 (1826); Trochocephalus caucasicus (M.Bieb.) Á.Löve & D.Löve, Preslia 46: 133 (1974); Scabiosa caucasea Sims, Bot. Mag. 23: t. 886 (1805), nom. rej. prop.; Scabiosa connata Hornem., Hort. Bot. Hafn. 1: 128 (1813); Scabiosa elegans Spreng., Pl. Min. Cogn. Pug. 2: 24 (1815); Scabiosa grandiflora Steud., Nomencl. Bot., ed. 2, 2: 525 (1841), not validly publ.; Sclerostemma connatum Schott, K.P.J.Sprengel, Syst. Veg. 3: 84 (1826)

= Lomelosia caucasica =

Species of flowering plant

Lomelosia caucasica, the Caucasian pincushion flower, pincushion-flower or Caucasian scabious, is a species of flowering plant in the family Caprifoliaceae, native to the Caucasus, north eastern Turkey, and northern Iran. Growing to 60 cm (24 in) tall and broad, it is a clump-forming perennial with grey-green, divided leaves. Pincushion-shaped buds, borne on erect hairy, stems, open to pale blue or lavender flower heads, 4–8 cm (2–3 in) in diameter, from late summer through to autumn.

It was formerly known as Scabiosa caucasica until 1985, when it became Lomelosia caucasica. It is still listed in some sources as Scabiosa caucasica.

== Taxonomy ==
After a study of the family Dipsacaceae (by Verlaque 1983), the Scabioseae were then split into several genera, with S. caucasica placed in Lomelosia Raf. (Greuter 1985). Further carpological and palynological studies (Mayer & Ehrendorf er 1999) have further confirmed this view, which has then been further substantiated by more recent data from molecular phylogenetics (Caputo & al. 2004; Avino & al. 2009).

The GBIF and United States Department of Agriculture and the Agricultural Research Service, agreed to the name change.

== Ecology ==
The plant is highly attractive to bees and other pollinating insects.

== Cultivars ==
Numerous cultivars have been developed for garden use, in shades of red, purple, pink, blue and white. The cultivars of 'Clive Greaves', (large, lavender blue), and 'Miss Willmott', (white with tall stems) have gained the Royal Horticultural Society's Award of Garden Merit.

Other cultivars include:-

- 'Blue Perfection' (blue)
- 'Bressingham White' (white)
- 'Claire Greaves' (lavender blue)
- 'Compliment' (large blue)
- 'Fama' (large lavender blue)
- 'Floral Queen' (light blue)
- 'Loddon White' (white)
- 'Moonbeam Blue' (dark blue)
- 'Mrs Isaac House' (creamy white)
- 'Perfecta' (dark lavender blue)
- 'Perfecta Alba Blanc' (white)
- 'Staefa' (blue)

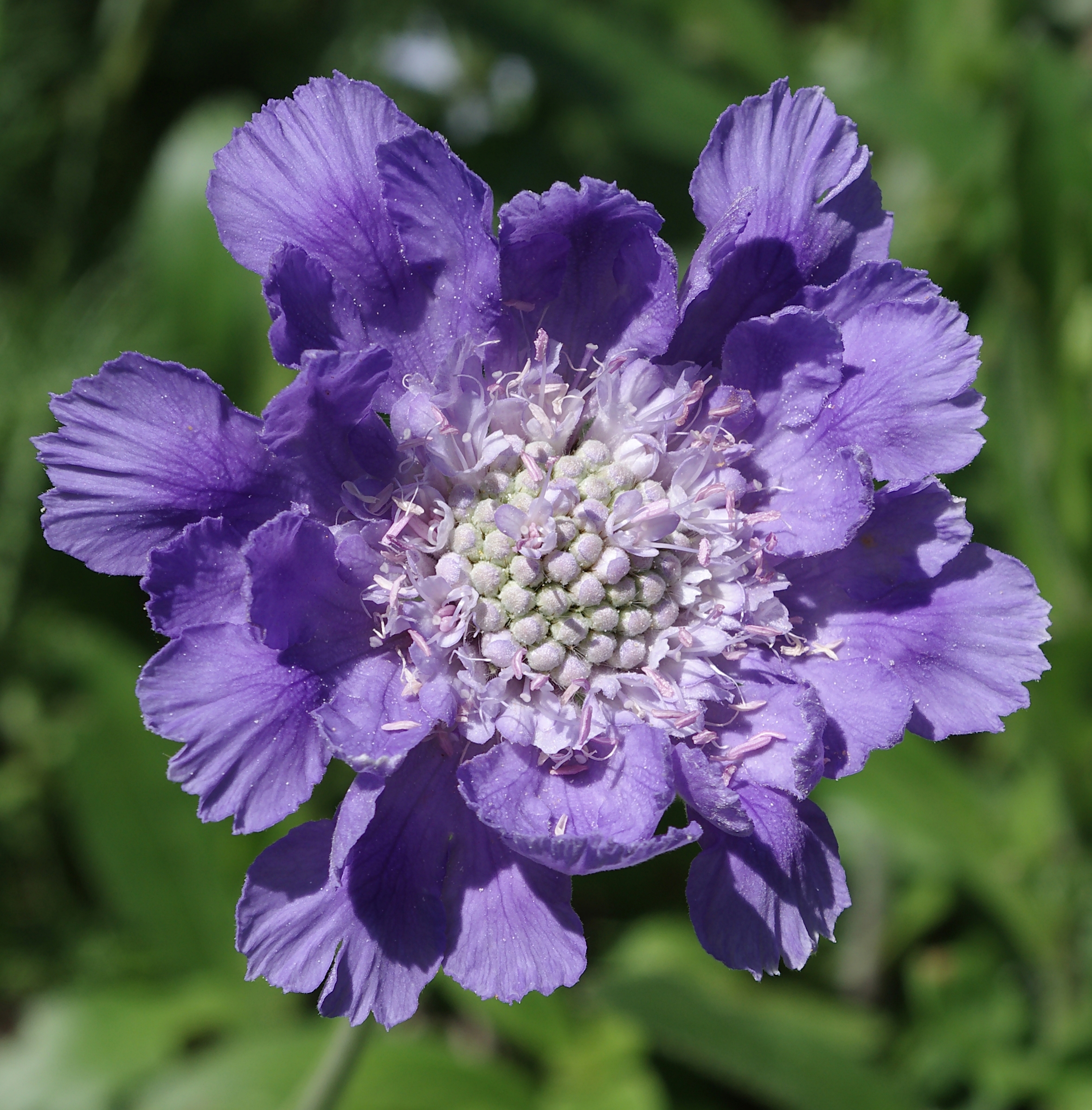

== Other sources ==
- Botanica, Einjährige und mehrjährige Pflanzen, Über 2000 Pflanzenporträts, ISBN 978-3-8331-4469-1, paĝe 790 (German)
