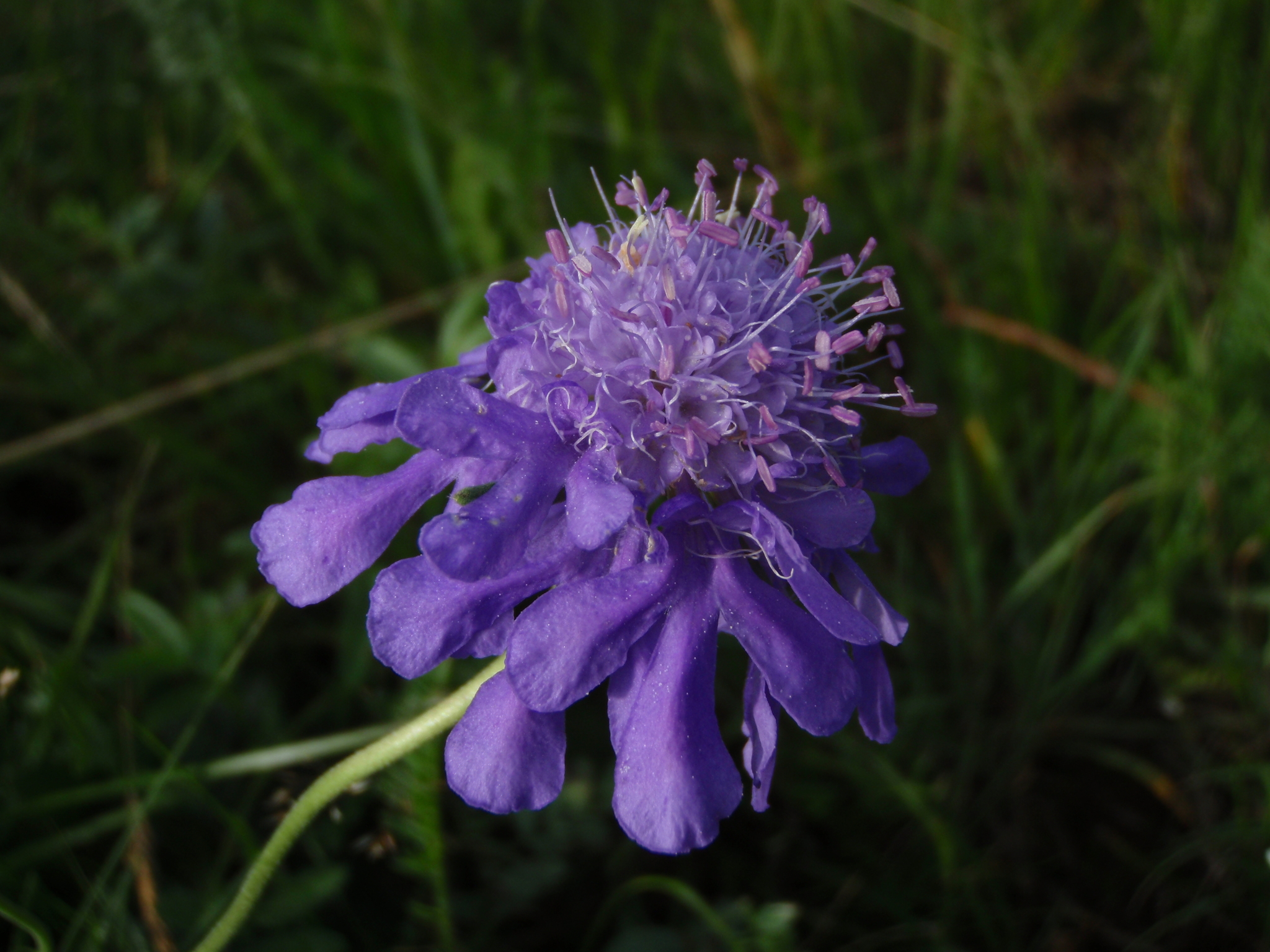
- Inflorescence
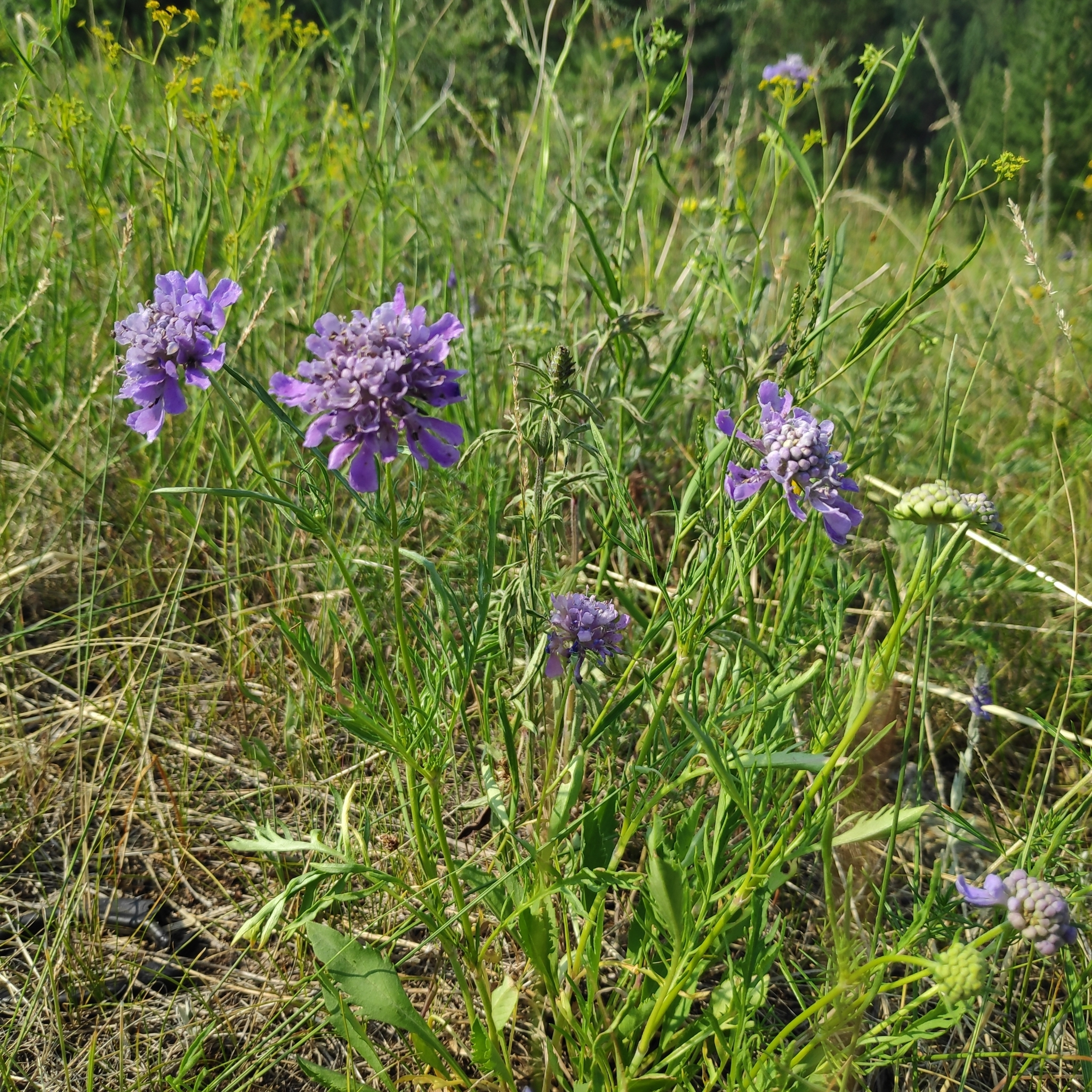
- In Buryatia, Russia

Scientific classification
- Kingdom: Plantae
- Clade: Tracheophytes
- Clade: Angiosperms
- Clade: Eudicots
- Clade: Asterids
- Order: Dipsacales
- Family: Caprifoliaceae
- Genus: Lomelosia
- Species: L. comosa

Binomial name
- Lomelosia comosa (Fisch. ex Roem. & Schult.) J.H.Xue, Chepinoga & K.P.Ma

Synonyms
- List: Scabiosa austromongolica Hurus.; Scabiosa comosa Fisch. ex Roem. & Schult.; Scabiosa comosa f. albiflora S.H.Li & S.Z.Liu; Scabiosa dahuriae Fisch. ex DC.; Scabiosa fischeri DC.; Scabiosa fischeri var. alpina Nakai; Scabiosa fischeri f. breviseta Hand.-Mazz.; Scabiosa fischeri f. glabra Nakai; Scabiosa hairalensis Nakai; Scabiosa hopeiensis Nakai; Scabiosa japonica var. mansenensis (Nakai) Hurus.; Scabiosa japonica f. zuikoensis (Nakai) Hurus.; Scabiosa mansenensis Nakai; Scabiosa mansenensis f. alpina Nakai; Scabiosa mansenensis f. pinnata Nakai; Scabiosa superba f. elatior Grüning; Scabiosa superba f. nana Grüning; Scabiosa togashiana Hurus.; Scabiosa tschiliensis f. alpina (Nakai) W.Lee; Scabiosa tschiliensis var. breviseta Hurus.; Scabiosa tschiliensis f. glabra (Nakai) U.C.La; Scabiosa tschiliensis var. longiseta Hurus.; Scabiosa tschiliensis f. pinnata (Nakai) W.Lee; Scabiosa tschiliensis f. zuikoensis (Nakai) W.Lee; Scabiosa zuikoensis Nakai; Trochocephalus austromongolicus (Hurus.) Á.Löve & D.Löve; Trochocephalus comosus (Fisch. ex Roem. & Schult.) Á.Löve & D.Löve; Trochocephalus hairalensis (Nakai) Á.Löve & D.Löve; Trochocephalus hopeiensis (Nakai) Á.Löve & D.Löve; Trochocephalus mansenensis (Nakai) Á.Löve & D.Löve; Trochocephalus togashianus (Hurus.) Á.Löve & D.Löve; Trochocephalus zuikoensis (Nakai) Á.Löve & D.Löve

= Lomelosia comosa =

Species of plant

Lomelosia comosa (most authorities continue to use its synonym Scabiosa comosa), the northeastern scabious, is a species of flowering plant in the family Caprifoliaceae. It is native to southern Siberia, Mongolia, north and east central China, and Korea. A perennial herb reaching 30 to 80 cm (12 to 31 in), it is typically found growing in dry areas such as dunes, slopes, and steppes at elevations from 300 to 1,600 m (1,000 to 5,200 ft). It is the national flower of Mongolia.
