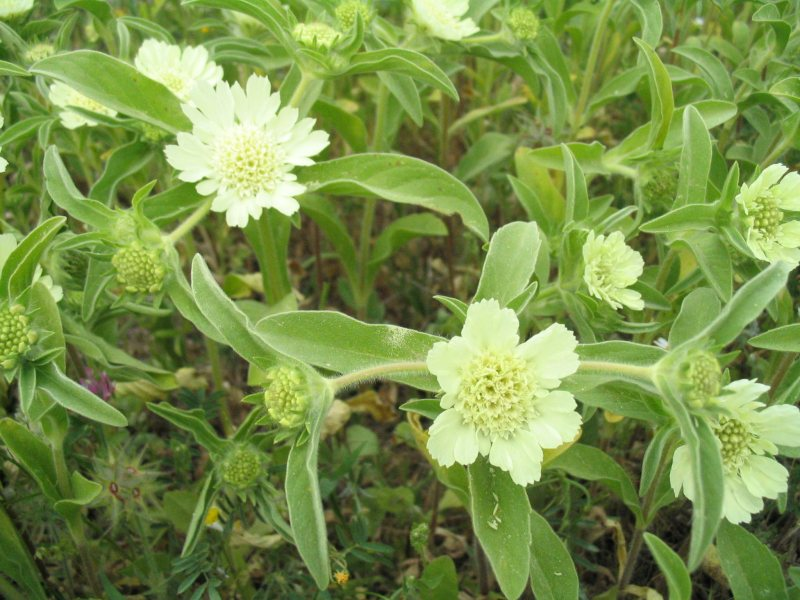

Scientific classification
- Kingdom: Plantae
- Clade: Tracheophytes
- Clade: Angiosperms
- Clade: Eudicots
- Clade: Asterids
- Order: Dipsacales
- Family: Caprifoliaceae
- Genus: Lomelosia
- Species: L. prolifera

Binomial name
- Lomelosia prolifera L.

Synonyms
- Asterocephalus prolifer (L.) Spreng.; Scabiosa prolifera L.; Trochocephalus prolifer (L.) Á.Löve & D.Löve

= Lomelosia prolifera =

Carmel daisy

Species of flowering plant

Lomelosia prolifera, the Carmel daisy, is a flowering plant of the family Caprifoliaceae. Its flowers in February to May, are creamy yellow, and when the petals are shed they leave a greenish-looking dried flower, good for arrangements. It is native to the eastern Mediterranean.

It is an annual, growing up to 40 cm high. It has erect stem with soft, rather long, whitish hairs. The leaves are arranged opposite, simple, entire or irregularly dentate, pale green and hairy on both surfaces. The flowers are zygomorphic and hermaphrodite, After flowering it produces an Achene.

It was first published in Willdenowia vol.15 on page 75 in 1985.

It is found in Cyprus, East Aegean Islands, Egypt, Lebanon, Syria, Israel and Turkey.

Habitat: Waste ground, roadsides, grassy slopes, fields, 0-1500 m alt.
