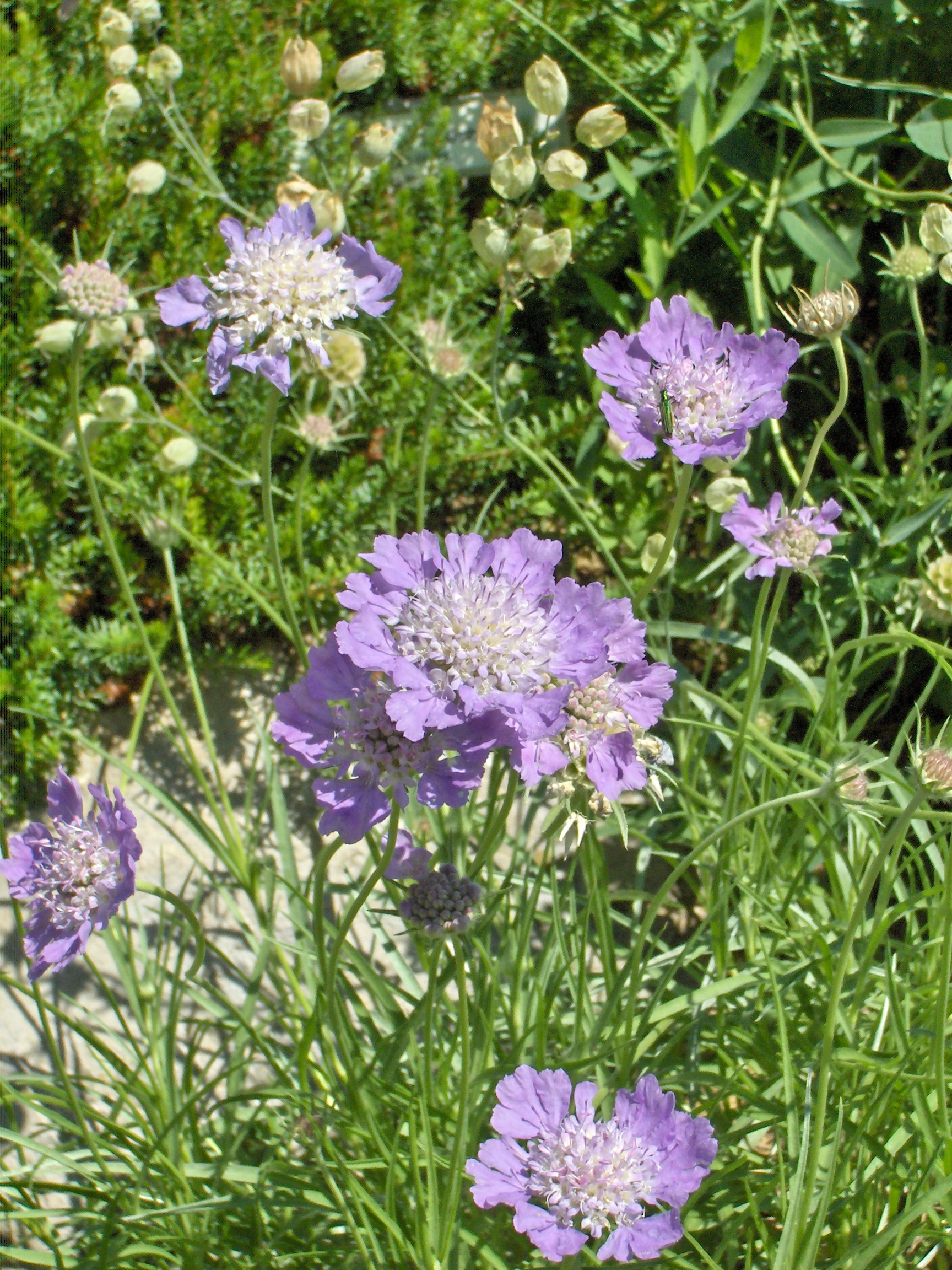

Scientific classification
- Kingdom: Plantae
- Clade: Tracheophytes
- Clade: Angiosperms
- Clade: Eudicots
- Clade: Asterids
- Order: Dipsacales
- Family: Caprifoliaceae
- Genus: Lomelosia
- Species: L. graminifolia

Binomial name
- Lomelosia graminifolia (L.) Greuter & Burdet

Synonyms
- Asterocephalus graminifolius (L.) Spreng.; Scabiosa graminifolia L.; Succisa graminifolia (L.) Moench; Trochocephalus graminifolius (L.) Opiz

= Lomelosia graminifolia =

Grass-leaved scabious

Species of flowering plant

Lomelosia graminifolia, synonym Scabiosa graminifolia, grass-leaved scabious, is a species of Lomelosia native to in the Mediterranean region from Morocco and Spain to Greece. The plant grows on rocky slopes. As its name indicates, this species has grass-like leaves. Its flowers are pink or lilac and open in summer.

== Distribution and habitat ==
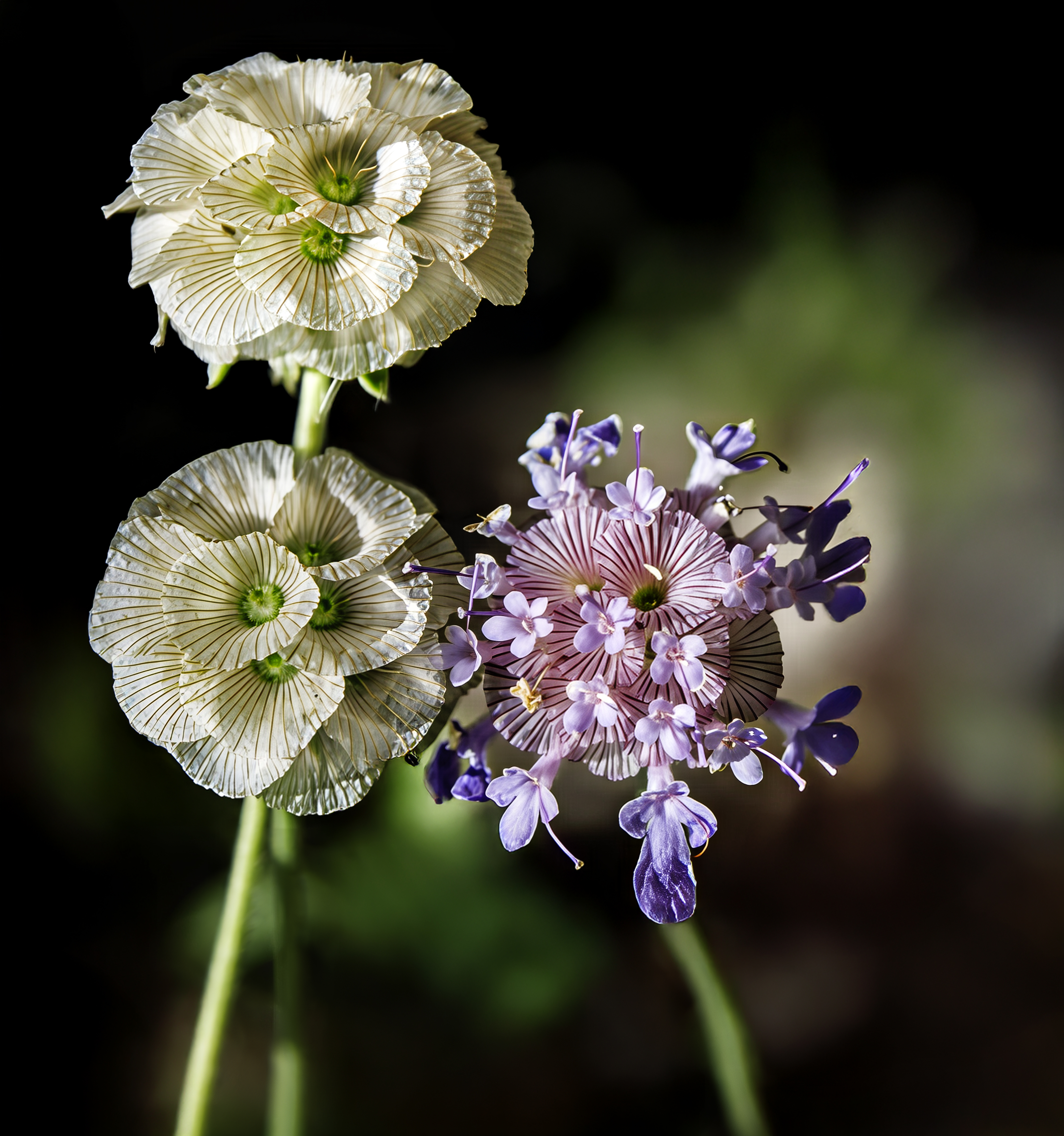
Lomelosia graminifolia - end of inflorescence beginning of infructescence in Auch

Lomelosia graminifolia is principally a south-European montane species, most frequent on the sunny limestone flanks of the southern and south-western Alps. Native to Morocco, it has been recorded from Albania, France, Greece, Italy, Spain, Switzerland, and former Yugoslavia. In Slovenia it reaches the north-eastern edge of its overall range: a 2020 survey discovered about twenty plants scattered across five micro-sites in the Trenta Valley (Julian Alps) at 520–810 m altitude. The individuals occupy narrow screes and gravelly ledges within the Sravnik ravine or on immediately adjacent rocky slopes, where only a veneer of soil overlies fractured limestone or dolomite.

Within the Trenta sites the species occurs in two contrasting, but equally open, plant communities. On mobile scree it forms a minor element of the Stipetum calamagrostis grassland, dominated by the needle-grass Achnatherum calamagrostis. Where the substrate is slightly more stable the plant co-dominates a newly described community, Aquilegio einseleanae–Caricetum mucronatae, whose shallow lithosols support Carex mucronata, Globularia cordifolia and the eastern-Alpine columbine (Aquilegia einseleana). Both communities are south-facing, dry and poor in nutrients, conditions that limit tall competitors and favour drought-tolerant perennials such as L. graminifolia.

Beyond the Julian Alps the species persists only in a handful of calcareous localities on the Soča River terraces near Solkan, the Nanos and Trnovski Gozd plateaux and the slopes of mount Snežnik; it remains unrecorded in Austria. These Slovenian outposts, together with the newly documented Trenta stands, confirm that the species can survive on very young, skeletal soils so long as slope aspect and drainage mimic the warm, rocky hillside habitats typical of its core distribution further west.
