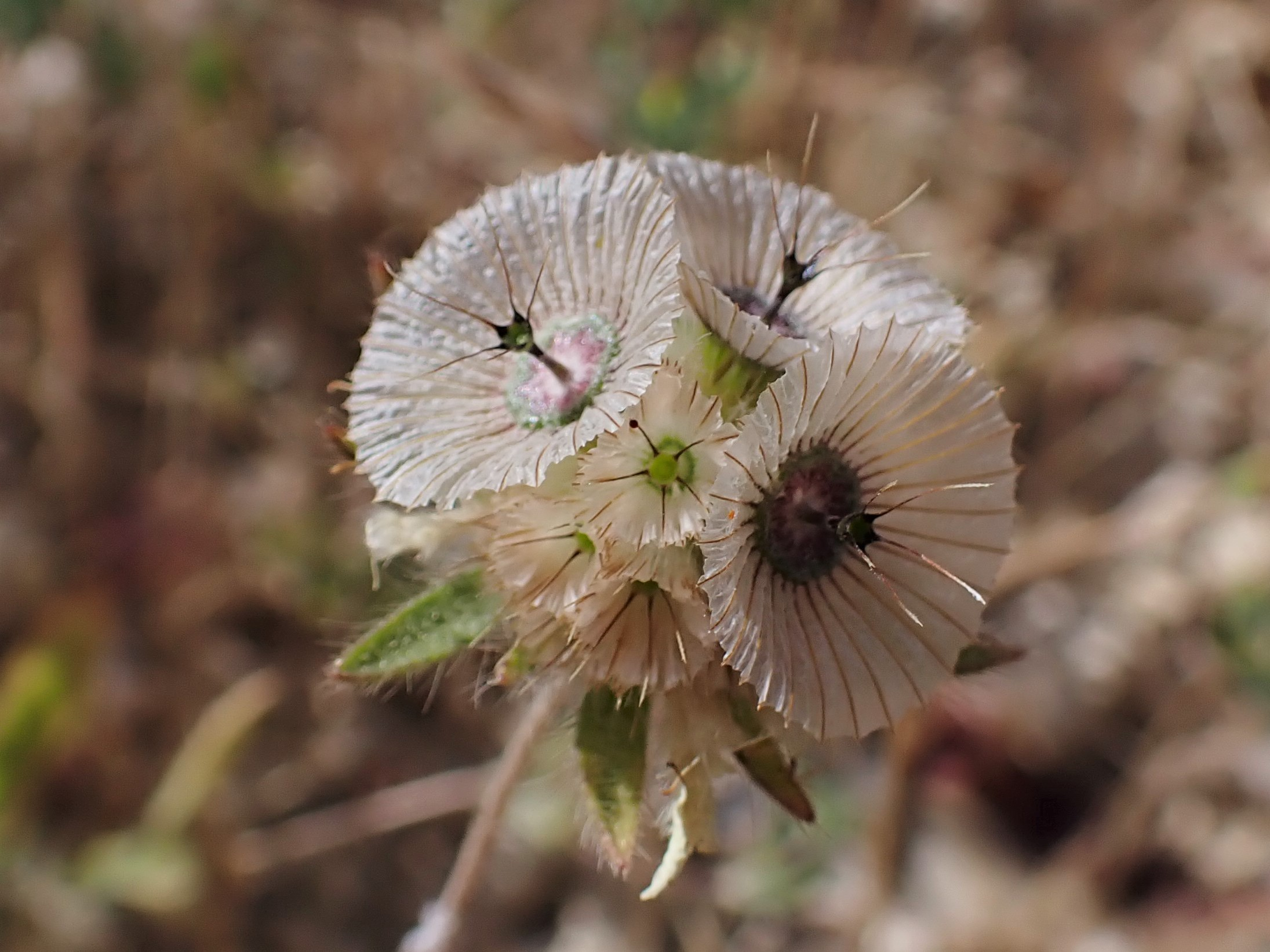
- Lomelosia palaestina at Kufranja Dam in Jordan

Scientific classification
- Kingdom: Plantae
- Clade: Embryophytes
- Clade: Tracheophytes
- Clade: Spermatophytes
- Clade: Angiosperms
- Clade: Eudicots
- Clade: Asterids
- Order: Dipsacales
- Family: Caprifoliaceae
- Subfamily: Dipsacoideae
- Genus: Lomelosia; Raf.

Species
- See text

Synonyms
- Callistemma (Mert. & W.D.J.Koch) Boiss., Fl. Orient. 3: 146 (1875); Scabiosiopsis Rech.f., Willdenowia 19: 153 (1989); Tereiphas Raf., Fl. Tellur. 4: 95 (1838); Tremastelma Raf., Fl. Tellur. 4: 96 (1838); Zygostemma Tiegh., Ann. Sci. Nat., Bot., sér. 9, 10: 164 (1909)

= Lomelosia =

Genus of flowering plants in the honeysuckle family

Lomelosia is a genus of flowering plant in the family Caprifoliaceae and the subfamily of Dipsacoideae. The genus includes over 50-63, perennial and annual species, diffused around the Mediterranean Sea, with the greatest diversity of species concentrated in the eastern Mediterranean and the Middle East (including the Arabian Peninsula), and also has a few species reaching as far east as China.

Morphologically, the genus accommodates all Scabiosa taxa with a pitted epicalyx. (an involucre (structure surrounding or supporting, usually a head of flowers) resembling an outer calyx (collective term for the sepals of the flower).

Some older books still list them under Scabiosa. or list both names together. Such as Scabiosa sicula L. [Lomelosia divaricata Jacq.) Greuter & Burdet].

== Taxonomy ==
Lomelosia was first published and described by french botanist Rafinesque in Flora Telluriana Vol.4 on page 95 in 1838, with a general description of Lomelosia stellata (L.) Raf.

The name Lomelosia is derived from the Greek word Loma meaning 'the edge or the border' which refers to the membranous border of the flower.

=== History ===
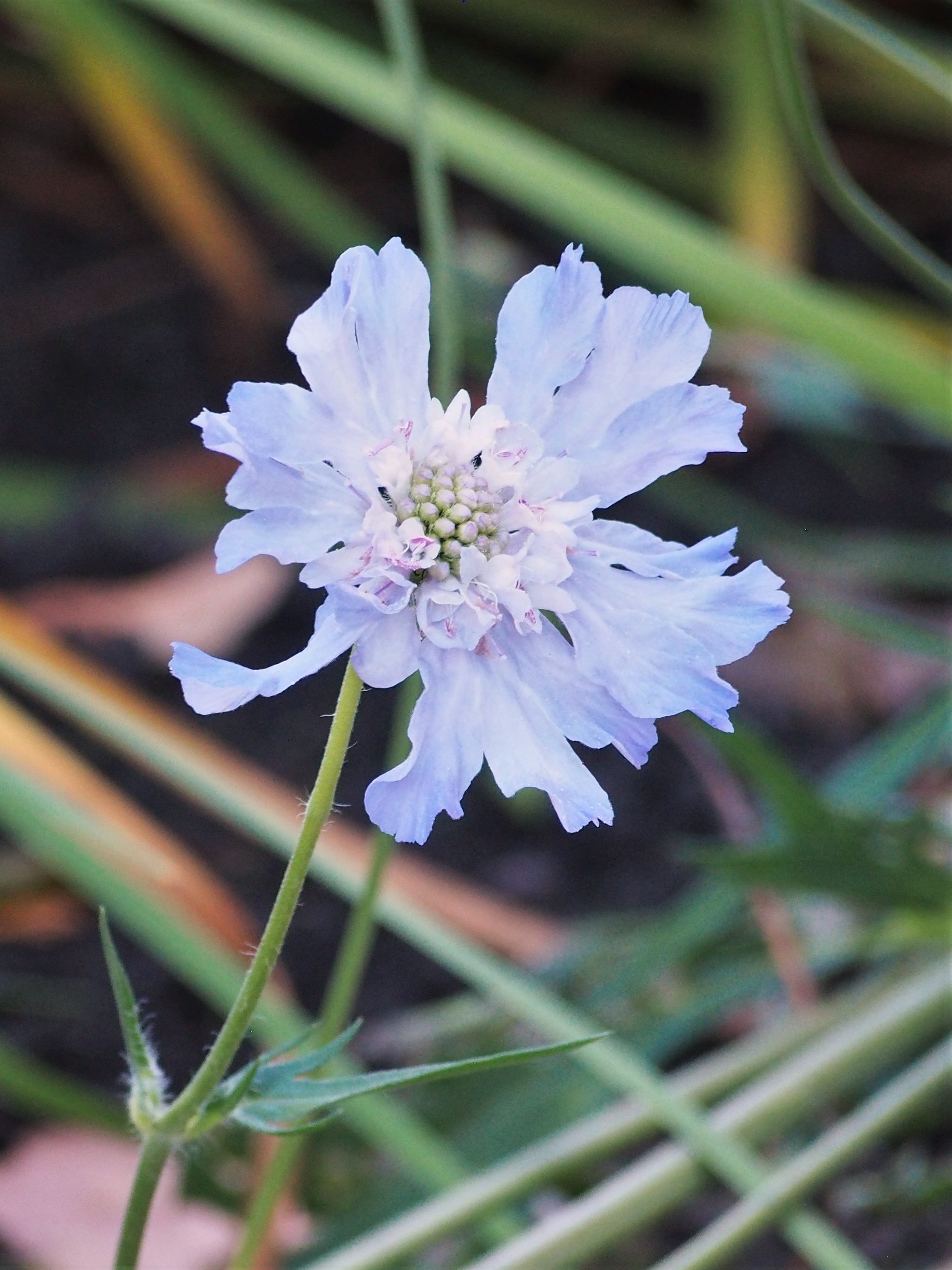
Flower of Lomelosia caucasica in Wrocław University Botanical Garden, Wrocław, Poland

It was included in Scabiosa L. for quite a long time (e.g. Jasiewicz 1976),

Earlier researchers had considered that the annual species of Scabiosa to be derived within Lomelosia and hypothesized that this was responsible for the successful colonization of the (mostly) Eastern Mediterranean, (Ehrendorfer, 1965a); and Verlaque, 1986b.

For very many years Lomelosia caucasica was known as Scabiosa caucasica M. Bieb. as well as several other species of Scabiosa. Then following a comprehensive study of the family Dipsacaceae by Verlaque in 1983, and by Devesa in 1984, the Scabioseae subfamily were then split into several genera, with S. caucasica placed in Lomelosia Raf. (Greuter 1985). López González in 1987 agreed with the split.

Greuter and Raus in 1985 divided Iranian species of Scabiosa into two genera as Lomelosia (= Scabiosa sect. Astrocephalus and sect. Olivierinae) and Scabiosa s. str. (Scabiosa s. l sect. scaboisa). Asterocephalus was later classed as a synonym of Scabiosa.

Soják in 1987 also transferred several species of Scabiosa taxa found in Asia, to the Lomelosia genus. Including Lomelosia flavida (Boiss. & Hausskn.) Soják, Lomelosia gumbetica (Boiss.) Soják, Lomelosia isetensis (L.) Soják, Lomelosia leucactis (Patzak) Soják, Lomelosia macrochaete (Boiss. & Hausskn.) Soják, Lomelosia olgae (Albov) Soják, Lomelosia rhodantha (Kar. & Kir.) Soják, Lomelosia speciosa (Royle) Soják,, Lomelosia songarica (Schrenk) Soják and Lomelosia ucranica (L.) Soják.

There are 22 species of Scabiosa recorded in the Flora Iranica by Rechinger in 1989, as he had not accepted the new term Lomelosia and had stated that species were later divided into two subgenera (Scabiosa and Asterocephalus) and three sections including Scabiosa, Asterocephalus and Olivierianae. He had used Scabiosa sect. Olivierianae to hold some of the annual species of Scabiosa subg. Asterocephalus. New species from Iran and Asia were also added to these three sections.

Molecular data demonstrated that Lomelosia (and Pycnocomon) form a clade distinct from Scabiosa (and Sixalix) (De Castro & Caputo 1997-1998, Further carpological (seed studies) and palynological studies by Mayer & Ehrendorf in 1999, have confirmed that Lomelosia was a separate genus from Scabiosa, which has been further substantiated by later data from molecular phylogenetics (Caputo & al. 2004; and Avino & al. 2009. In 2009, the DNA clade of Scabioseae, consisting of Pterocephalus s.str., Sixalix, Scabiosa, Lomelosia, and Pycnocomon was established. Lomelosia can be distinguished from the other related genera by the presence of eight pits on the epicalyx tube (De Castro & Caputo 2001).

The annual Lomelosia brachiata was resolved to be a genetic sister to the rest of Lomelosia and Pycnocomon in 2009.

In 2010, the Dipsacoideae subfamily was divided into 2 genetic DNA clades: the Knautia–Cephalaria–Dipsacus–Succisella clade and the Scabiosa–Pterocephalus–Lomelosia clade.

In 2011, 4 more species from the Scabiosa genus with a pitted epicalyx transferred to Lomelosia, Lomelosia deserticola (Rech. f.) P. Caputo & Del Guacchio, Lomelosia poecilocarpa (Rech. f.) P. Caputo & Del Guacchio, Lomelosia schimperiana (Boiss. & Buhse) P. Caputo & Del Guacchio, and Lomelosia transcaspica (Rech. f.) P. Caputo & Del Guacchio.

In 2013, V. Mayer and Ehrend established Lomelosieae, a subgenus within Lomelosia.

== Description ==
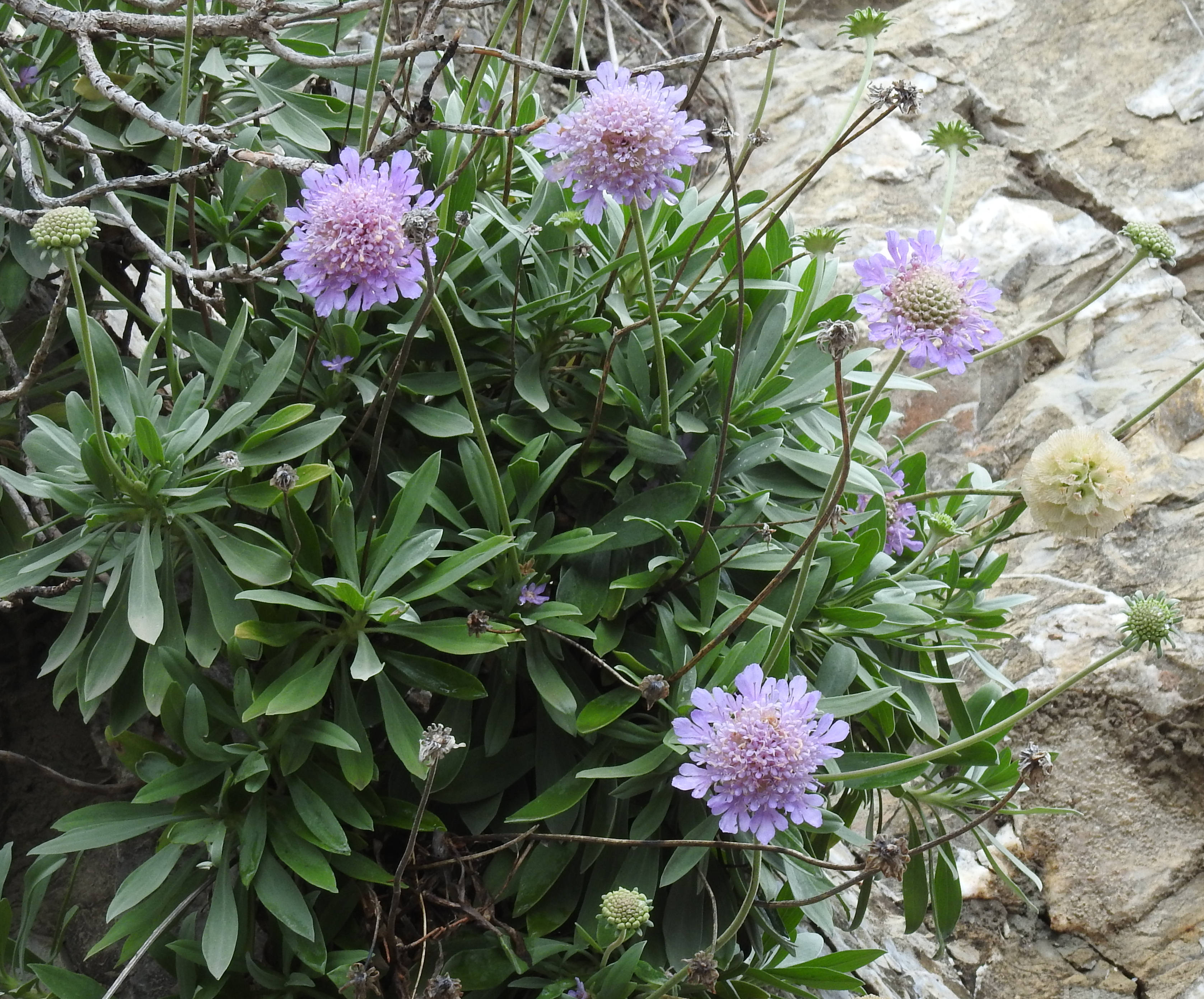
Lomelosia cretica from Taormina, Sicily

Lomelosia is made up of perennial and annual, herbaceous species, examples include; Lomelosia persica is an annual species, while Lomelosia caucasica M. Bieb. is a perennial.

They are sometimes suffruticose (having a woody base, but herbaceous higher up), unarmed, without prickles. Leafy or scapiform stems, which have short hairs. It has sessile or petiolate (stalked) leaves. They are whole and toothed. They can be pinnatifid, pinnatipartite or pinnatisect. The basal leaves are sometimes in a rosette, persistent or not at anthesis (fully open flowering). They have hemispheric chapters at anthesis which are globose or ovoid at the time of fruiting. It has numerous free bracts, arranged in 1-2 (or 3) rows. They are entire or pinnatifid, receptacle at first hemispherical and then conical or cylindrical (in shape), hairy, with herbaceous-scarious bracteoles. They have hermaphroditic, pentamerous (5 part) flowers, which are subactinomorphic (less than star-shaped) or zygomorphic (bilateral). They are almost equal or the peripheral ones of the larger chapter. The secondary involucre is homomorphous, sessile, without basal elasome, shaped like a cylindrical tube, with no apparent nerves or ribs and is densely hirsute. They have 8 foveolae in the distal half. It has a campanulate (bell-shaped) crown, which is scarious (dry and membranous) and hyaline (translucent), with ± scalloped edge. They are traversed by numerous smooth or scabrid nerves, sometimes excurrent (extending). The midriff is scarious and hairy. It consists of 8 adnate tabs and with a cylindrical projection that surrounds the calyx stipe. The calyx is pateniform, pentagonal (in shape), ± stipitate, with glanduliferous or eglandulous hairs. It has 5 subulate or widened edges at the base, they are ± scabrid, erect-patent or patent and persistent. The corolla has 5 lobes, that of the peripheral flowers are often zygomorphic, with very unequal lobes. As 3 are bigger than the other 2 lobes. The central is major, so that of the flowers in the center are subactinomorphic. They come in shades of pink, violet-pink or blue-like. The androecium is made of 4 stamens. The stigma is capitate (resembles the head of a pin), bilobate (split in two) and oblique. The fruit (or seed capsule) is an achene (dry fruit) which is glabrous or hairy. (Translated from Spanish).

They are generally have involucral bracts not connate (fused to another organ), entire and radiant, the epicalyx is cylindrical and the corona can be large.

== Species ==
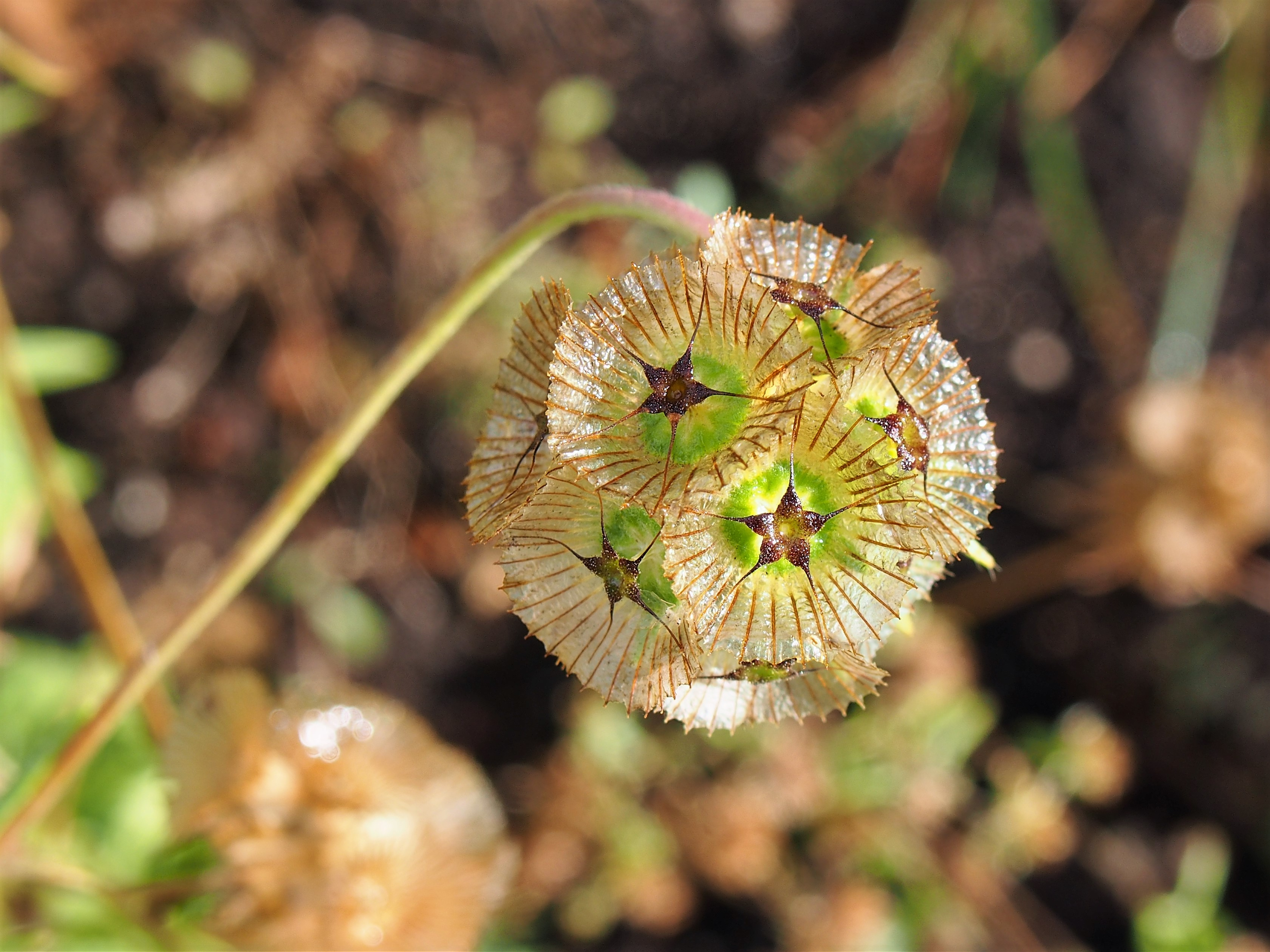
Seed head of Lomelosia stellata (syn. Scabiosa stellata) in Wrocław University Botanical Garden, Wrocław, Poland.

63 Accepted species by Plants of the World Online (as of October 2023):

- Lomelosia albocincta (Greuter) Greuter & Burdet
- Lomelosia alpestris (Kar. & Kir.) Soják
- Lomelosia argentea (L.) Greuter & Burdet
- Lomelosia aucheri (Boiss.) Greuter & Burdet
- Lomelosia austroaltaica (Bobrov) Soják
- Lomelosia balianii (Diratz.) Greuter & Burdet
- Lomelosia bicolor (Kotschy ex Boiss.) Greuter & Burdet
- Lomelosia brachiata (Sm.) Greuter & Burdet
- Lomelosia brachycarpa (Boiss. & Hohen.) Soják
- Lomelosia calocephala (Boiss.) Greuter & Burdet
- Lomelosia camelorum (Coss. & Durieu) Greuter & Burdet
- Lomelosia candollei (Wall. ex DC.) Soják
- Lomelosia caucasica (M.Bieb.) Greuter & Burdet
- Lomelosia cosmoides (Boiss.) Greuter & Burdet
- Lomelosia crenata (Cirillo) Greuter & Burdet
- Lomelosia cretica (L.) Greuter & Burdet
- Lomelosia cyprica (Post) Greuter & Burdet
- Lomelosia deserticola (Rech.f.) P.Caputo & Del Guacchio
- Lomelosia divaricata (Jacq.) Greuter & Burdet
- Lomelosia epirota (Halácsy & Bald.) Greuter & Burdet
- Lomelosia esfandiarii (Jamzad) Ranjbar & Z.Ranjbar
- Lomelosia flavida (Boiss. & Hausskn.) Soják
- Lomelosia graminifolia (L.) Greuter & Burdet
- Lomelosia gumbetica (Boiss.) Soják
- Lomelosia hispidula (Boiss.) Greuter & Burdet
- Lomelosia hololeuca (Bornm.) Greuter & Burdet
- Lomelosia hymettia (Boiss. & Spruner) Greuter & Burdet
- Lomelosia isetensis (L.) Soják
- Lomelosia kurdica (Post) Greuter & Burdet
- Lomelosia leucactis (Patzak) Soják
- Lomelosia lycia (Stapf) Greuter & Burdet
- Lomelosia macrochaete (Boiss. & Hausskn.) Soják
- Lomelosia micrantha (Desf.) Greuter & Burdet
- Lomelosia minoana (P.H.Davis) Greuter & Burdet
- Lomelosia oberti-manettii (Pamp.) Greuter & Burdet
- Lomelosia olgae (Albov) Soják
- Lomelosia olivieri (Coult.) Greuter & Burdet
- Lomelosia palaestina (L.) Raf.
- Lomelosia paucidentata (Hub.-Mor.) Greuter & Burdet
- Lomelosia persica (Boiss.) Greuter & Burdet
- Lomelosia poecilocarpa (Rech.f.) P.Caputo & Del Guacchio
- Lomelosia polykratis (Rech.f.) Greuter & Burdet
- Lomelosia porphyroneura (Blakelock) Greuter & Burdet
- Lomelosia prolifera (L.) Greuter & Burdet
- Lomelosia pseudisetensis (Lacaita) Pignatti & Guarino
- Lomelosia pseudograminifolia (Hub.-Mor.) Greuter & Burdet
- Lomelosia pulsatilloides (Boiss.) Greuter & Burdet
- Lomelosia reuteriana (Boiss.) Greuter & Burdet
- Lomelosia rhodantha (Kar. & Kir.) Soják
- Lomelosia rhodopensis (Stoj. & Stef.) Greuter & Burdet
- Lomelosia roberti (Barratte) Greuter & Burdet
- Lomelosia rotata (M.Bieb.) Greuter & Burdet
- Lomelosia rufescens (Freyn & Sint.) Greuter & Burdet
- Lomelosia schimperiana (Boiss. & Buhse) P.Caputo & Del Guacchio
- Lomelosia simplex (Desf.) Raf.
- Lomelosia songarica (Schrenk) Soják
- Lomelosia speciosa (Royle) Soják
- Lomelosia sphaciotica (Roem. & Schult.) Greuter & Burdet
- Lomelosia stellata (L.) Raf.
- Lomelosia sulphurea (Boiss. & A.Huet) Greuter & Burdet
- Lomelosia transcaspica (Rech.f.) P.Caputo & Del Guacchio
- Lomelosia ulugbekii (Zakirov) Soják
- Lomelosia variifolia (Boiss.) Greuter & Burdet

GRIN (United States Department of Agriculture and the Agricultural Research Service) only accepts 12 species: Lomelosia argentea, Lomelosia calocephala, Lomelosia caucasica, Lomelosia cretica, Lomelosia divaricata, Lomelosia graminifolia, Lomelosia micrantha, Lomelosia minoana, Lomelosia palaestina, Lomelosia prolifera, Lomelosia speciosa and Lomelosia stellata.

== Distribution ==
Lomelosia is described as an Old World genus and it is distributed from the Mediterranean region to Central Asia.

It is found in the European countries (and regions) of Albania, the Balearic Islands, Bulgaria, Cyprus, East Aegean Islands, France, Greece, Italy, Crete, Portugal, Romania, Sardinia, Sicily, Spain, Switzerland, Ukraine and Yugoslavia. In Russia, (Altai (region), Crimea, East European Russia, South European Russia and West Siberia. In Northern Africa within Algeria, Egypt, Tunisia, Libya and Morocco. In the Middle East, within Afghanistan, Iran, Iraq, Kuwait, Lebanon, Syria, Oman, Pakistan, Palestine, Saudi Arabia, and Turkey. In central Asia within Kazakhstan, Kirghistan, North Caucasus, Tajikistan, Transcaucasus, Turkmenistan, Uzbekistan and West Himalaya. Also in eastern Asia in Xinjiang (China).

== Habitat ==
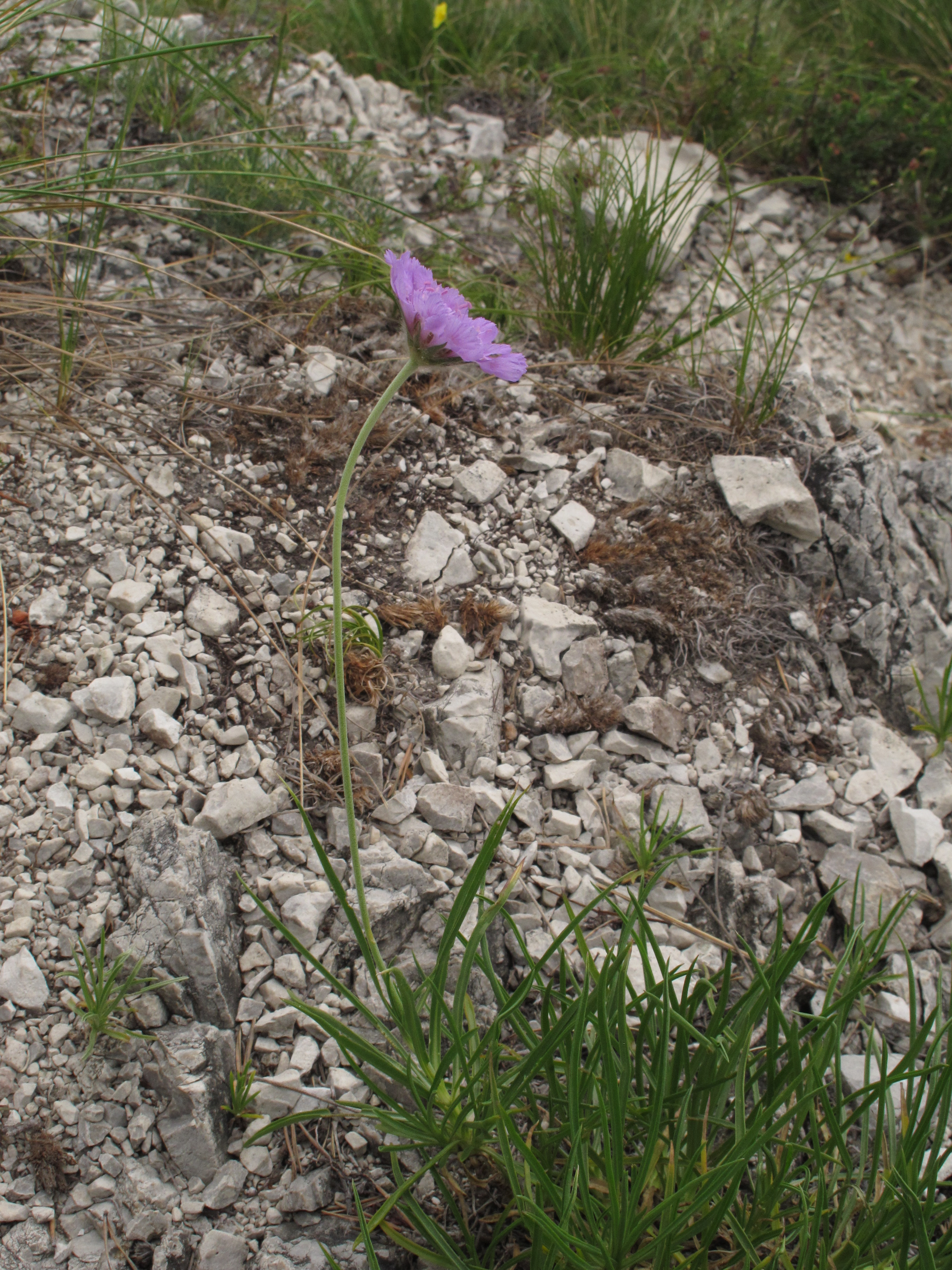
Grass-leaved scabious (Lomelosia graminifolia) near Limone sul Garda, Italy

Lomelosia species like a range of habitats.

For example, Lomelosia cyprica is found on dry slopes in garigue (low scrubland) and open pine forests at altitudes of 150 and 1,200 m (490 and 3,940 ft) above sea level.

While L. argentea likes arid meadows and garigue, L. crenata likes detrital (rocky) slopes and L. graminifolia likes stony slopes (in Italy).

Lomelosia minoana is Greek and Crete native rock-dwelling plant.

While Lomelosia deserticola (Rech.f.) P.Caputo & Del Guacchio is found in deserts of Syria, Jordan, Iraq and Pakistan and Lomelosia schimperiana (Boiss. & Buhse) P. Caputo & Del Guacchio is found in open environments in Iran.

== Ecology ==
The flowers of Lomelosia are insect pollinated, mainly by bees and bumblebees, as the plants give them a reward of nectar and pollen. Other insects are occasional visitors, such as long-tongues hoverflies (Syrphidae), moths (Proctor et al. 1996), Lepidoptera (such as Lycaenidae) and Diptera) (Muller 1873,).

== Uses ==
Lomelosia hymettia is considered as a medicinal plant (Grigoriadou et al., 2019), with antimicrobial properties (Christopoulou et al., 2008).

Several species of Lomelosia are grown as ornamentals in Europe. Jäger & al. (2008; sub Scabiosa) cites L. caucasica (M. Bieb.) Greuter & Burdet, L. graminifolia (L.) Greuter & Burdet, L. prolifera (L.) Greuter & Burdet and 'L. stellata (L.) Raf. Matthews (2000; also sub Scabiosa) even cites 12 additional species that are cultivated in European gardens. One of these, L. stellata, has been recorded as a casual escape in Belgium.

While L. graminifolia (L.) Greuter & Burdet (Barth, 2020), L. hymettia (Boiss. & Spruner) Greuter & Burdet and L. cretica (L.) Greuter & Burdet are xerophytes used in landscaping designs. L. prolifera (L.) Greuter & Burdet has been used as part of green roof plantations (Cristaudo et al., 2015).

== Cultivation ==
Successful propagation in various species of Lomelosia has been reported both via seed growing and by vegetative methods. Propagation with cuttings for species Lomelosia hymettia was carried out using Indole-3-butyric acid (IBA, hormone rooting agent) with results to a high rate of rooting (92.5–100%) during autumn, compared to 50–67.5% during the spring (Vlachou et al., 2019). In-vitro propagation has also been successfully employed for Lomelosia argentea (L.) Greuter & Burdet (Panayotova et al., 2008).

== Other sources ==
- Brummitt R. K. 2007: Dipsacaceae. — Pp. 129–130 in: Heywood V. H., Brummitt R. K., Culhan A. & Seberg O. (ed.), Flowering plant families of the world. — Kew: Royal Botanic Gardens.
- Jäger E.J., Ebel F., Hanelt P. & Müller G. (eds.) (2008) Rothmaler Band 5. Exkursionsflora von Deutschland. Krautige Zier- und Nutzpflanzen. Springer Verlag, Berlin: 880 p.
- Jasiewicz A. (1976) Scabiosa. In: Tutin T.G. & al. (eds.), Flora Europaea, vol. 4. Cambridge University Press, Cambridge: 68-74.
- Matthews V.A. (2000) Scabiosa. In: Cullen J. & al. (eds.), The European Garden Flora, vol. 6. Cambridge University Press, Cambridge: 460-465.
