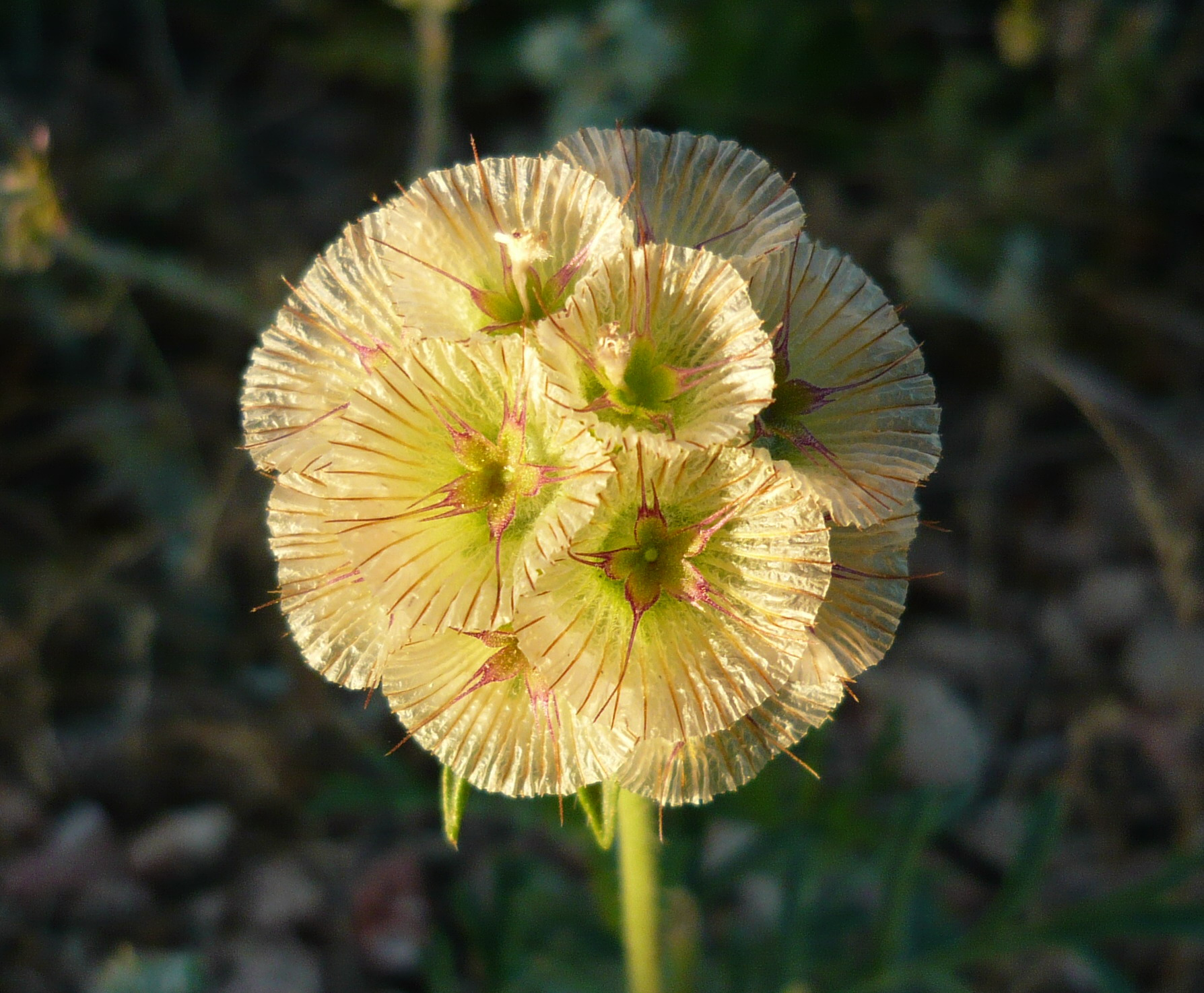
- in fruit

Scientific classification
- Kingdom: Plantae
- Clade: Tracheophytes
- Clade: Angiosperms
- Clade: Eudicots
- Clade: Asterids
- Order: Dipsacales
- Family: Caprifoliaceae
- Genus: Lomelosia
- Species: L. stellata

Binomial name
- Lomelosia stellata (L.) Raf.

Synonyms
- List: Asterocephalus monspeliensis (Jacq.) Zumagl.; Asterocephalus stellatus (L.) Spreng.; Scabiosa bipinnata Nyman, not validly publ.; Scabiosa brevicoma Nyman, not validly publ.; Scabiosa collina Salisb., nom. illeg.; Scabiosa hispanica Willd. ex Roem. & Schult.; Scabiosa jacquinii Roem. & Schult.; Scabiosa lobata Nyman; Scabiosa monspeliensis Jacq.; Scabiosa monspeliensis var. subacaulis Rouy; Scabiosa simplex DC., nom. illeg.; Scabiosa stellaris Salisb., nom. superfl.; Scabiosa stellata L.; Scabiosa stellata subsp. insularis F.Herm.; Scabiosa stellata subsp. monspeliensis (Jacq.) Rouy; Scabiosa stellata var. monspeliensis (Jacq.) DC.; Succisa stellata (L.) Moench; Trochocephalus monspeliensis (Jacq.) Á.Löve & D.Löve; Trochocephalus stellatus (L.) Á.Löve & D.Löve

= Lomelosia stellata =

Species of flowering plant

Lomelosia stellata, synonyms including Scabiosa stellata, is a species of flowering plant in the honeysuckle family, Caprifoliaceae. It is known by the common name starflower pincushions or starflower scabious. It was formerly placed in the teasel family. Native to southwestern Europe and North Africa, it is also grown as an ornamental plant. This erect annual has an inflorescence which is a dense spherical cluster of pale blue flowers, followed by showy fruits with striped, fan-like funnel-shaped papery bracts.
