= Carpology =

Study of seeds and fruit

Carpology is a discipline of botany devoted to the study of seeds and fruits. The German inventor Joseph Gaertner, an 18th-century doctor and botanist, dedicated his life to the study of natural history. He considered its inventor. When the discipline is applied to archaeological remains, it is known as paleocarpology, which in turn is located within paleobotanical science.

Carpology pursues two objectives: to reconstruct the evolution of a certain plant species; and to recreate the landscape and, thus, its flora and fauna.

Carpology data is considered "auxiliary" for fields such as archeology. Among other things, carpology can distinguish between indigenous seeds and those that have been domesticated for human cultivation. Landscape flora can be extrapolated.

Numerous research centers host carpology departments. France, the United Kingdom, the Netherlands, Belgium or Germany are the European states with the longest history of this discipline. Teams are dedicated to carpology also in Spain and Italy.

Teams carry out research in places such as Syria, Lebanon, Algeria, or Tunisia. This work linked to archeology by exploiting carpological materials.

== Famous Carpologists ==
- Joseph Gaertner
- Augustin Pyramus de Candolle
- Charles-François Brisseau de Mirbel
- Carl Linnaeus
- Alphonse de Candolle
- Asa Gray
- Adolphe-Théodore Brongniart
- George Bentham
