= National Cooperative Soil Survey =

Program to understand and manage US soils

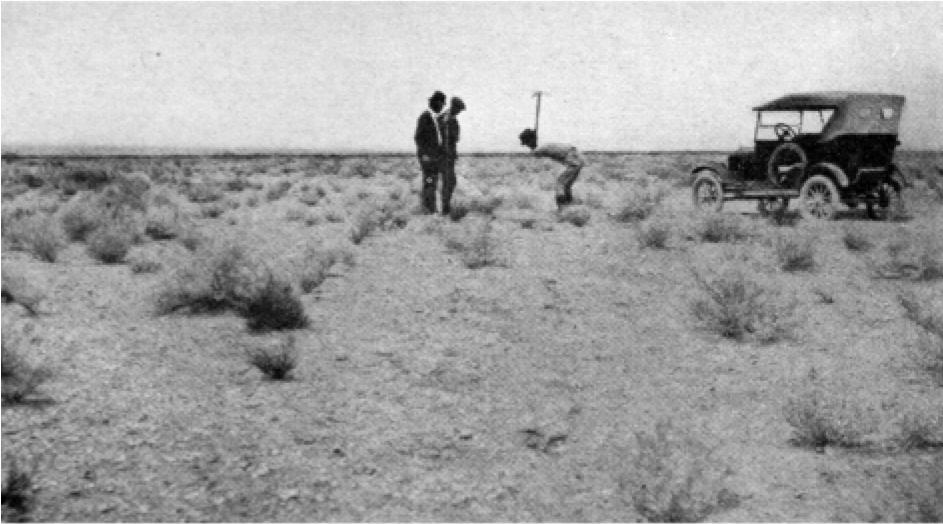
From a Report of Bureau of Soils, U.S. Department of Agriculture, 1923.

The National Cooperative Soil Survey Program (NCSS) in the United States is a nationwide partnership of federal, regional, state, and local agencies and institutions. This partnership works together to cooperatively investigate, inventory, document, classify, and interpret soils and to disseminate, publish, and promote the use of information about the soils of the United States and its trust territories. The activities of the NCSS are carried out on national, regional, and state levels.

== Overview ==
The National Cooperative Soil Survey Program (NCSS) is a partnership led by the United States Department of Agriculture's Natural Resources Conservation Service of Federal land management agencies, state agricultural experiment stations, counties, conservation districts, and other special-purpose districts that provide soil survey information necessary for understanding, managing, conserving and sustaining the nation's soil resources.

It seeks to inventory soil resources as a basis for determining land capabilities and needed conservation treatments, to provide soil information to the public (primarily through maps), and to provide technical support to those who use soil information. More than 90% of private lands have been mapped. In FY2001, maps were prepared or updated on 21,900,000 acres (89,000 km^{2}), including 25 counties or areas for the first time.

== History ==
While the National Cooperative Soil Survey has involved multiple partners since its inception in 1896, Federal responsibility for coordinating partner efforts has resided within the USDA. However, soil survey responsibilities have moved several times within the USDA:

- 1894 Division of Agricultural Soil within the USDA Weather Bureau.
- 1899 Name changed to Division of Soils.
- 1901 Division moved up in status to Bureau of Soils.
- 1927 Merged with the Bureau of Chemistry, forming the Bureau of Chemistry and Soils.
- 1938 Soils unit transferred to the Bureau of Plant Industry.
- 1942 Changed name to Bureau of Plant Industry, Soils, and Agricultural Engineering, becoming part of the Agricultural Research Administration.
- 1952 Soil survey program transferred to the Soil Conservation Service (SCS).
- 1994 Name changed to Natural Resources Conservation Service.

=== Early history ===
The original federal authority for the soil survey of the United States is contained in the record of the 53rd Congress, chapter 169, Agricultural Appropriations Act of 1896.

Milton Whitney was the first Chief of the Division of Agricultural Soil. The division was created under the USDA Weather Bureau in 1894, but, with the inception of National Cooperative Soil Survey efforts, became the Division of Soils as an independent division within the Department of Agriculture. The early vision of soil survey was a survey that combined geography with soil chemistry. The men conducting the surveys were geologists or chemists; none had training in agronomy.

On May 3, 1899, with an appropriation of $16,000 Whitney began field operations. In four separate soil surveys about 720,000 acres (2,900 km^{2}) were mapped that first year. Cecil County, Maryland, and Connecticut Valley, Connecticut, concentrated on tobacco lands. Survey of the Salt Lake Valley of Utah and the Pecos River Valley of New Mexico concentrated on alkali soil areas where irrigation and land reclamation projects were planned. Soil surveys focused on cropland or interpretations for cropland until the 1970s when the scope of the NCSS was expanded to focus on urban lands.

Of the four survey areas initiated in 1899, three were published the next year. These first surveys cost about 3/10ths of a cent per acre. As of 1999, soil surveys cost about $3/acre.

Soil texture was the main differentiating soil characteristic used in the early survey process. Soil series were soon to follow as groupings of soil types. By 1906 Miami soil series included 16 soil types from the glaciated regions and Norfolk series included 12 soil types from the coastal plains. Several other characteristics were added by that time. They were soil color, organic content, soil structure, drainage, erodibility, and nature of subsoil. Soil provinces were established and soil series were confined to their area. Series at first were identified where the soils formed from the same accumulated parent material: glaciated, wind blown, alluvial etc.

Geological Survey maps were generally unavailable and early soil surveyors used the plane table and alidade to develop their own base maps. Work for soil surveys was done at a mapping scale 1 inch to the mile. Scale as of 1999 is pretty well standardized at 1:12000 or 1:24000. Six different scales have been used in published soil surveys.

In 1913 Curtis F. Marbut was appointed Scientist in Charge of the Soil Survey, the position he held almost until his death. Marbut was Professor of Geology and Physiography at the University of Missouri from 1895 until 1910. As a geologist and geographer his initial view was that soils were surface reflections of the geology below them. Marbut changed to recognize soil science as distinct from geology. Eugene W. Hilgard of the University of California and Hopkins of the University of Illinois greatly influenced this change. The land-grant universities from the very start were close partners in National Cooperative Soil Survey. By 1920, most soil surveyors were graduates of land-grant universities and other agricultural colleges with training in soils and crops.

The recognition of soil science as a distinct discipline was also influenced by the Russian school of soil science and K.D. Glinka (1867–1927) in particular. These soil scientists characterized soils based on soil horizons of the soil profile. This recognized soils more on natural boundaries. Previously the soil was divided into sections by 6 2/3 inch increments to 40 inches (1,000 mm) depth. Depths used were 0 to 7, 7 to 13, 13 to 20, 20 to 27, 27 to 34, 34 to 40 inches (1,000 mm). Forty inches was the depth of observation for a number of years, then later it was extended to 60 inches (1,500 mm) and subsequently to 2 meters.

In 1920 Marbut began his work on a soil classification scheme. In 1927 he published a translation of Glinka's The Great Soil Groups of the World and their Development from German to English. His classification scheme became the 1935 system that was modified to become the system published in the 1938 Yearbook of Agriculture, Soils and Men: the 1938 USDA soil taxonomy. At the highest level of classification the soils were divided into pedocals and pedalfers. Pedocals were used in the drier climates and referred to the carbonate rich soils. The Pedalfers began about at the Udic border and referred to soils rich in Aluminum (Alumen) and Iron (Ferrous). Alfer became the root term for Alfisols.

Following 1938, classifying soil series according to the system met with mixed success. By 1945 the development of a new system began. The first version, termed an "approximation" was tested by the 1948. A series of approximations followed and the 7th approximation came out in 1960. The supplement to the 7th approximation was approved for use in 1965. USDA soil taxonomy, with 10 soil orders came out in 1975. It was revised into the 2nd edition with 12 soil orders in 1999.

In 1933 Franklin D. Roosevelt created the Soil Erosion Service under the Department of the Interior. Hugh Hammond Bennett, after a 30-year career with the Bureau of Chemistry and Soils, was first chief and within 2 years the Soil Erosion Service moved to Department of Agriculture as the Soil Conservation Service. The Soil Conservation Service (SCS) ended up with much of the budget and soils personnel of the Bureau of Chemistry and Soils, but did not support the Bureau of Chemistry and Soils approach to soil survey.

The Soil Conservation Service (SCS) pushed farm by farm surveys using a utilitarian legend. The symbol indicated the soil properties. These symbols and surveys continued until the 1970s. Conflict existed between the SCS and the other partners within the NCSS during the 20 years from 1933 to 1952. Marbut did not feel that soil erosion threatened the food supply of the United States and wrote that to the National Academy of Science, in direct opposition to Bennett. Marbut died in 1935 on a trip to China. Charles Kellogg, a professor of soil science at North Dakota State University, became the new Chief of the Bureau of Chemistry and Soils. He produced the Soil Survey Manual of 1937 that gave direction on the procedure for soil survey to be used by both Bureau of Chemistry and Soils and SCS soil surveys.

During the Great Depression, the soil survey efforts slowed. The Bureau continued it soil survey efforts but with reduced funding. The SCS was put in charge of the Civilian Conservation Corps (CCC) involving a massive workforce to build terraces and other demonstrations on agricultural lands. As a result, highly specialized studies, such as soil surveys, were limited. In 1942, the CCC was disbanded and SCS revived its soil survey efforts

Hugh Bennett promoted local interest and input in soil conservation. To achieve this, Bennett pushed for soil districts in each state. Each district board, made up of elected local landowners and farmers, determines the issues and concerns for their area, usually a county, with the SCS providing requested technical assistance. by the 1940s, most states had passed laws to form Soil Conservation Districts. In some states, like Indiana, Conservation Districts became dissatisfied with Federal technical involvement and SCS was excluded from the state. Consistent with this, states like Indiana directed their own cooperative soil survey efforts. In some states like Missouri, the newly formed districts, relying on SCS technical assistance, ignored scientific data and input from the universities, which responded by opposing the formation of additional districts. This was resolved by the expansion of the Cooperative Extension Service. It is now typical for all counties have a Conservation District, and a University Extension agent. Both Conservation Districts and Cooperative Extension are partners in the National Cooperative Soil Survey.

In 1951, the SCS developed the Land Capability System. By using factors such as flooding frequency, slope, rockiness and clay or sand content, the best use for the soil can be estimated. National Cooperative Soil Survey standards assure the soil survey data is consistent with the Land Capability Classification System.

During the Dwight D. Eisenhower administration much of the Department of Agriculture was reorganized. In 1952, all soil survey work by the USDA was consolidated and responsibility for Federal leadership in the National Cooperative Soil Survey partnership was given to the SCS. This included all mapping, classification, interpretation, laboratory services, map compilation and nationwide publication. The Bureau was then abolished and Kellogg became head of the USDA soil survey program.

After being assigned the responsibility of the entire soil survey program, the SCS shifted from making individual conservation plan soil surveys and land use maps to making complete county soil surveys. This reorganization did not set well with some universities and individuals that had been involved in the soil survey program up to that point. From 1899 until this time a number of agencies, both state and federal, had financial support to perform soil survey work. The consolidation of soil survey activities (and funding) into the SCS program was a hard pill for many to swallow.
