= Physical geography =

Study of processes and patterns in the natural environment

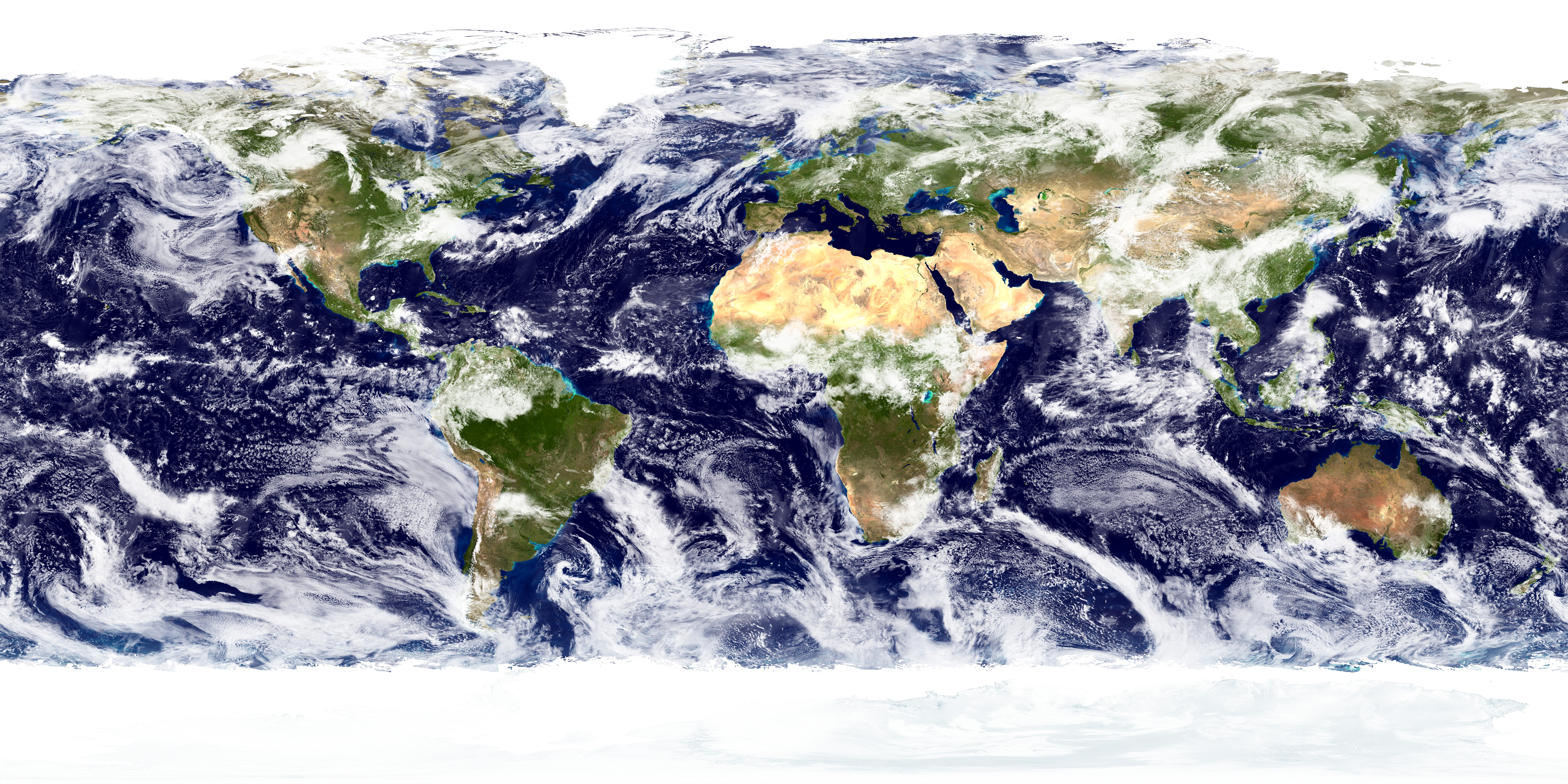
NASA true-color image of the Earth's surface and atmosphere

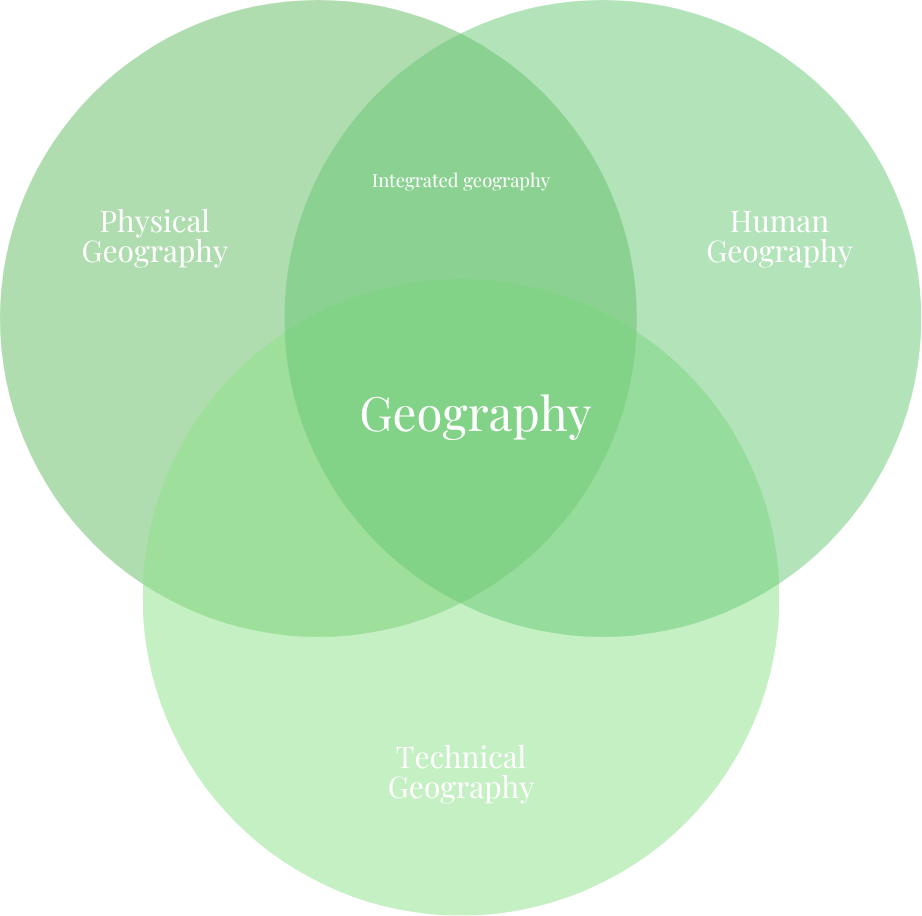
The relationship between the three branches of geography

Physical geography, also known as physiography or natural geography, is one of the three main branches of geography. Physical geography is the branch of natural science which deals with the processes and patterns in the natural environment such as the atmosphere, hydrosphere, biosphere, and geosphere. This focus contrasts with the branch of human geography, which focuses on the built environment, and technical geography, which focuses on the use, study, and creation of tools for obtaining, analyzing, interpreting, and understanding spatial information. The three branches have significant overlap, however.

== Sub-branches ==
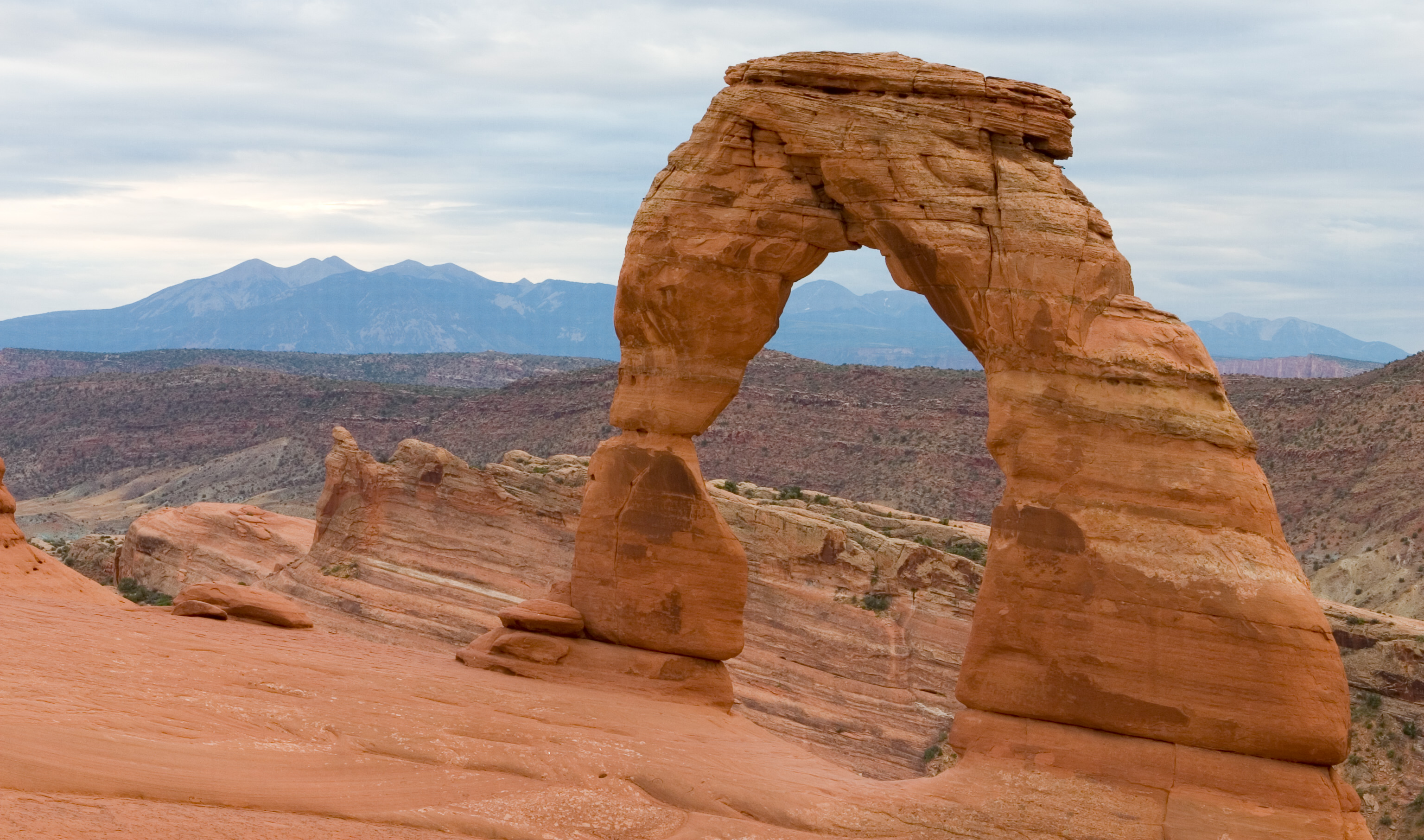
A natural arch

Physical geography can be divided into several branches or related fields, as follows:

- Geomorphology is concerned with understanding the surface of the Earth and the processes by which it is shaped, both at the present as well as in the past. Geomorphology, as a field, has several sub-fields that deal with the specific landforms of various environments, e.g., desert geomorphology and fluvial geomorphology; however, these sub-fields are united by the core processes that drive them, mainly tectonic or climatic processes. Geomorphology seeks to understand landform history and dynamics and to predict future changes through a combination of field observation, physical experiments, and numerical modeling (Geomorphometry). Early studies in geomorphology form the foundation of pedology, one of the two main branches of soil science.

Meander formation

- Hydrology is predominantly concerned with the amounts and quality of water moving and accumulating on the land surface and in the soils and rocks near the surface and is typified by the hydrological cycle. Thus, the field encompasses water in rivers, lakes, aquifers, and to an extent glaciers, in which the field examines the process and dynamics involved in these bodies of water. Hydrology has historically had an important connection with engineering and has thus developed largely quantitative methods in its research; however, it also has an earth science side that embraces the systems approach. As in most fields of physical geography, it has subfields that examine specific bodies of water or their interactions with other spheres, e.g., limnology and ecohydrology.
- Glaciology is the study of glaciers and ice sheets, or more commonly the cryosphere or ice and phenomena that involve ice. Glaciology groups the latter (ice sheets) as continental glaciers and the former (glaciers) as alpine glaciers. Although research in these areas is similar to research on the dynamics of ice sheets and glaciers, the former tends to focus on the interaction of ice sheets with the present climate, and the latter on the impact of glaciers on the landscape. Glaciology also has a vast array of subfields that examine the factors and processes involved in ice sheets and glaciers, e.g., snow hydrology and glacial geology.
- Biogeography is the science that deals with geographic patterns of species distribution and the processes that result in these patterns. Biogeography emerged as a field of study through the work of Alfred Russel Wallace. However, before the late twentieth century, it had largely been viewed as historical in its outlook and descriptive in its approach. The main stimuli for the field since its founding have been evolution, plate tectonics, and the theory of island biogeography. The field can largely be divided into five sub-fields: island biogeography, paleobiogeography, phylogeography, zoogeography and phytogeography.
- Climatology is the study of the climate, scientifically defined as weather conditions averaged over a long period of time. Climatology examines both the nature of micro (local) and macro (global) climates and the natural and anthropogenic influences on them. The field is also largely subdivided into regional climates and the study of specific phenomena or time periods, e.g., tropical cyclone rainfall climatology and paleoclimatology.
- Soil geography deals with the distribution of soils across the terrain. This discipline, between geography and soil science, is fundamental to both physical geography and pedology. Pedology is the study of soils in their natural environment. It deals with pedogenesis, soil morphology, soil classification. Soil geography studies the spatial distribution of soils as it relates to topography, climate (water, air, temperature), soil life (micro-organisms, plants, animals), and mineral materials within soils (biogeochemical cycles).
- Palaeogeography is a cross-disciplinary study that examines the preserved material in the stratigraphic record to determine the distribution of the continents through geologic time. Almost all the evidence for the positions of the continents comes from geology in the form of fossils or paleomagnetism. The use of these data has resulted in evidence for continental drift, plate tectonics, and supercontinents. This, in turn, has supported palaeogeographic theories such as the Wilson cycle.
- Coastal geography is the study of the dynamic interface between the ocean and the land, incorporating both the physical geography (i.e., coastal geomorphology, geology, and oceanography) and the human geography of the coast. It involves an understanding of coastal weathering processes, particularly wave action, sediment movement, and weathering, and also how humans interact with the coast. Coastal geography, although predominantly geomorphological in its research, is concerned not only with coastal landforms but also with the causes and influences of sea level change.
- Oceanography is the branch of physical geography that studies the Earth's oceans and seas. It covers a wide range of topics, including marine organisms and ecosystem dynamics (biological oceanography); ocean currents, waves, and geophysical fluid dynamics (physical oceanography); plate tectonics and the geology of the sea floor (geological oceanography); and fluxes of various chemical substances and physical properties within the ocean and across its boundaries (chemical oceanography). These diverse topics reflect the multiple disciplines that oceanographers blend to advance knowledge of the world ocean and its processes.
- Quaternary science is an interdisciplinary field of study focusing on the Quaternary period, which encompasses the last 2.6 million years. The field studies the last ice age, the recent interstadial, and the Holocene, using proxy evidence to reconstruct past environments and infer the climatic and environmental changes that have occurred.
- Landscape ecology is a sub-discipline of ecology and geography that address how spatial variation in the landscape affects ecological processes such as the distribution and flow of energy, materials, and individuals in the environment (which, in turn, may influence the distribution of landscape "elements" themselves such as hedgerows). The field was largely funded by the German geographer Carl Troll. Landscape ecology typically addresses problems in an applied, holistic context. The main difference between biogeography and landscape ecology is that the latter is concerned with how flows of energy and materials are altered and their impacts on the landscape. In contrast, the former concerns the spatial patterns of species and chemical cycles.
- Geomatics is the field of gathering, storing, processing, and delivering geographic information, or spatially referenced information. Geomatics includes geodesy (scientific discipline that deals with the measurement and representation of the Earth, its gravitational field, and other geodynamic phenomena, such as crustal motion, oceanic tides, and polar motion), cartography, geographical information science (GIS) and remote sensing (the short or large-scale acquisition of information of an object or phenomenon, by the use of either recording or real-time sensing devices that are not in physical or intimate contact with the object).
- Environmental geography is a branch of geography that analyzes the spatial aspects of interactions between humans and the natural world. The branch bridges the divide between human and physical geography. It thus requires an understanding of the dynamics of geology, meteorology, hydrology, biogeography, and geomorphology, as well as how human societies conceptualize the environment. The branch was previously more prominent in research than it is at present, with theories such as environmental determinism linking society to the environment. It has largely become the domain of environmental management or anthropogenic influences.

== Journals and literature ==
Main category: Geography Journals

Physical geography and earth science journals communicate and document the results of research conducted at universities and other research institutions. Most journals cover a specific field and publish research within that field; unlike human geographers, physical geographers tend to publish in interdisciplinary journals rather than predominantly in geography journals. The research is typically presented as a scientific paper. Additionally, textbooks, books, and magazines on geography communicate research to laypeople, although these tend to focus on environmental issues or cultural dilemmas. Examples of journals that publish articles from physical geographers include The Professional Geographer, Journal of Maps, Earth Surface Processes and Landforms, Natural Hazards and Earth System Sciences, and Nature.

== Historical evolution of the discipline ==
From the birth of geography as a science during the Greek classical period until the late nineteenth century, with the birth of anthropogeography (human geography), geography was almost exclusively a natural science: the study of location and a descriptive gazetteer of all places in the known world. Among the best- known works of this long period are those of Strabo (Geography), Eratosthenes (Geographika), and Dionysius Periegetes (Periegesis Oiceumene) in the Ancient Age. Later examples include the Summa de Geografía of Martín Fernández de Enciso from the early sixteenth century, the first such work to refer to the New World, and the Kosmos of Alexander von Humboldt in the nineteenth century, in which geography is regarded as a physical and natural science.

During the eighteenth and nineteenth centuries, a controversy originating in geology, between supporters of James Hutton (uniformitarianism) and Georges Cuvier (catastrophism), strongly influenced the field of geography, because geography at this time was a natural science.

Two historical events in the nineteenth century significantly influenced the further development of physical geography. The first was the European colonial expansion in Asia, Africa, Australia, and America in search of raw materials required by industries during the Industrial Revolution. This fostered the creation of geography departments in the universities of the colonial powers and the birth and development of national geographical societies, thereby giving rise to the process Horacio Capel identified as the institutionalization of geography.

The exploration of Siberia is an example. In the mid-eighteenth century, many geographers were sent to perform geographical surveys in Arctic Siberia. Among these was Mikhail Lomonosov, who is considered the patriarch of Russian geography. In the mid-1750s, Lomonosov began working in the Department of Geography at the Academy of Sciences to conduct research in Siberia. He demonstrated the organic origin of soil and developed a comprehensive law governing the movement of ice, thereby founding a new branch of geography: glaciology. In 1755, on his initiative, Moscow University was founded, where he promoted the study of geography and the training of geographers. In 1758, he was appointed director of the Department of Geography at the Academy of Sciences, a post from which he developed a working methodology for geographical surveys and directed major long expeditions and geographical studies in Russia.

The contributions of the Russian school became more frequent through his disciples. Nineteenth- century Russian geographers included Vasily Dokuchaev, whose works include the "principle of comprehensive analysis of the territory" and "Russian Chernozem". In the latter, he introduced the geographical concept of soil, as distinct from a simple geological stratum, and thus found a new geographic area of study: pedology. Climatology also received a strong boost from the Russian school through Wladimir Köppen, whose main contribution, climate classification, remains valid today. However, this great geographer also contributed to the paleogeography through his work "The climates of the geological past", and he is considered the father of paleoclimatology. Other Russian geographers who made significant contributions to the discipline in this period include NM Sibirtsev, Pyotr Semyonov, K.D. Glinka and Neustrayev.

The second important event was Darwin's theory of evolution in the mid-nineteenth century, which gave an important impetus to the development of biogeography. The theory decisively influenced the work of Friedrich Ratzel, who had academic training as a zoologist and was a follower of Darwin's ideas.

Another major event in the late nineteenth and early twentieth centuries took place in the United States. William Morris Davis not only made important contributions to establishing the discipline in his country but also developed the cycle of erosion theory, which he proposed as a paradigm for geography in general, although in practice it served as a paradigm for physical geography. His theory explained that mountains and other landforms are shaped by factors that are manifested cyclically. He explained that the cycle begins with the uplift of the relief by geological processes (faulting, volcanism, tectonic uplift, etc.). Factors such as rivers and runoff begin to create V-shaped valleys between the mountains (the "youth" stage). During this first stage, the terrain is steeper and more irregular. Over time, the currents can carve wider valleys ("maturity") and then start to wind, leaving only towering hills ("senescence"). Finally, everything is reduced to a flat plain at the lowest possible elevation (called "baseline"). Davis called this plain a "peneplain", meaning "almost plain". Then river rejuvenation occurs, there is another uplift, and the cycle continues.

Although Davis's theory is not entirely accurate, it was innovative in its time and helped modernize geography and create the subfield of geomorphology, whose content had not previously differed from the rest of geography. Its implications prompted extensive research in various branches of physical geography. In paleogeography, this theory provided a model for understanding landscape evolution. In hydrology, glaciology, and climatology, it encouraged research into how geographic factors shape the landscape and affect the cycle. Geomorphology developed considerably shortly afterwards. Some of Davis's disciples made significant contributions to various branches of physical geography, including Curtis Marbut in pedology, Mark Jefferson, and Isaiah Bowman.

== See also ==
- Areography
- Atmosphere of Earth
- Concepts and Techniques in Modern Geography
- Earth system science
- Environmental studies
- Geophysics
- Planetary science
- Physiographic regions of the world
- Selenography
