= History of soil science =

The early concepts of soil were based on ideas developed by a German chemist, Justus von Liebig (1803–1873), and modified and refined by agricultural scientists who worked on samples of soil in laboratories, greenhouses, and on small field plots. The soils were rarely examined below the depth of normal tillage. These chemists held the "balance-sheet" theory of plant nutrition. Soil was considered a more or less static storage bin for plant nutrients—the soils could be used and replaced. This concept still has value when applied within the framework of modern soil science, although a useful understanding of soils goes beyond the removal of nutrients from soil by harvested crops and their return in manure, lime, and fertilizer.

The early geologists generally accepted the balance-sheet theory of soil fertility and applied it within the framework of their own discipline. They described soil as disintegrated rock of various sorts—granite, sandstone, glacial till, and the like. They went further, however, and described how the weathering processes modified this material and how geologic processes shaped it into landforms such as glacial moraines, alluvial plains, loess plains, and marine terraces. Geologist Nathaniel Shaler (1841–1906) monograph (1891) on the origin and nature of soils summarized the late 19th century geological concept of soils.

Early soil surveys were made to help farmers locate soils responsive to different management practices and to help them decide what crops and management practices were most suitable for the particular kinds of soil on their farms. Many of the early workers were geologists because only geologists were skilled in the necessary field methods and in scientific correlation appropriate to the study of soils. They conceived soils as mainly the weathering products of geologic formations, defined by landform and lithologic composition. Most of the soil surveys published before 1910 were strongly influenced by these concepts. Those published from 1910 to 1920 gradually added greater refinements and recognized more soil features but retained fundamentally geological concepts.

The balance-sheet theory of plant nutrition dominated the laboratory and the geological concept dominated field work. Both approaches were taught in many classrooms until the late 1920s. Although broader and more generally useful concepts of soil were being developed by some soil scientists, especially Eugene W. Hilgard (1833–1916) and George Nelson Coffey (1875–1967) in the United States and soil scientists in Russia, the necessary data for formulating these broader concepts came from the field work of the soil survey.

== Friedrich Albert Fallou ==
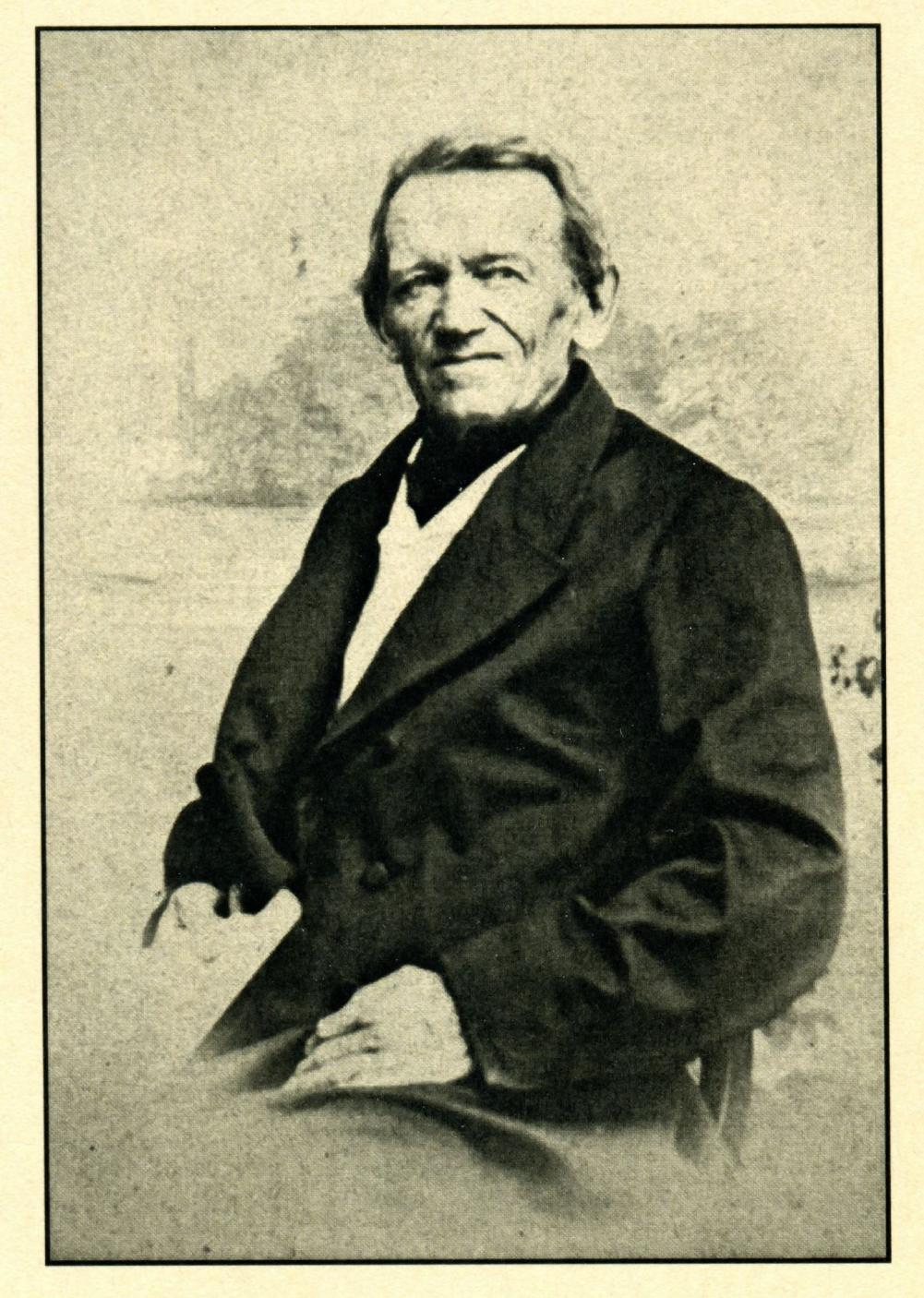
F.A. Fallou before his death in 1877

In his two books First Principles of Soil Science (1857, 2nd ed. 1865) and Pedology or General and Special Soil Science (1862) Friedrich Albert Fallou developed his collected field observations of soil into a systematic approach. He explained why soil formation was worthy of study and appealed for recognition of soil science as a discipline. In the 1862 work, he presented a proposal for soil profile description, discussed the physical and chemical properties of soils, and proposed classification of soils based on mineral properties.

Vasily Dokuchaev is recognized today as more influential than Fallou, however in the years closely following Dokuchaev's death, Fallou was regarded as the founder of modern soil science by Dokuchaev's student, influential Russian pedologist Konstantin Dmitrievich Glinka (1867–1927). Fallou's historical status as founder is supported by Moscow soil scientist and bibliographer of Russian soil science, Arseny Yarilov, Editor of Pochvovedenie (means soil science). Yarilov titled his 1904 article about Fallou in Pochvovedenie "Friedrich Albert Fallou, Founder of Soil Science".

== Vasily Dokuchaev ==
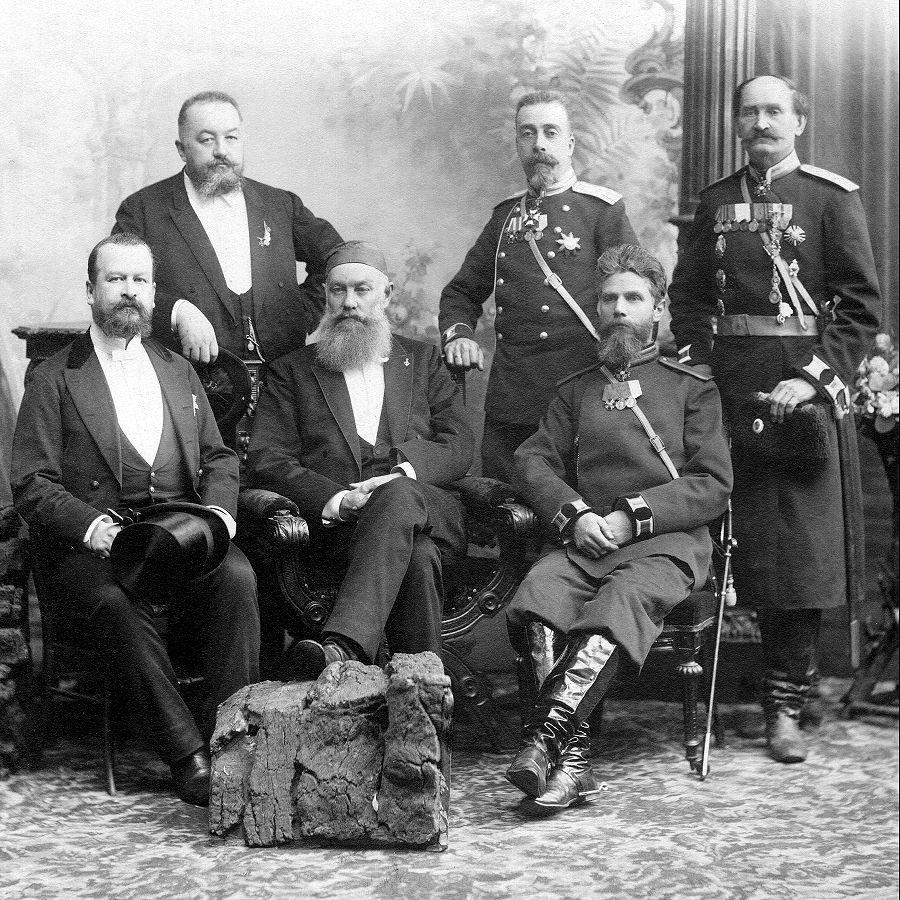
V. Dokuchaev with chernozem

The scientific basis of soil science as a natural science was established by the classical works of Vasily V. Dokuchaev. Previously, soil had been considered a product of physicochemical transformations of rocks, a dead substrate from which plants derive nutritious mineral elements. Soil and bedrock were in fact equated.

Dokuchaev considers the soil as a natural body having its own genesis and its own history of development, a body with complex and multiform processes taking place within it. The soil is considered as different from bedrock. The latter becomes soil under the influence of a series of soil-forming factors—climate, vegetation, country, relief and age. According to him, soil should be called the "daily" or outward horizons of rocks regardless of the type; they are changed naturally by the common effect of water, air and various kinds of living and dead organisms.

Beginning in 1870, the Russian school of soil science under the leadership of V. V. Dokuchaev (1846–1903) and N. M. Sibirtsev (1860–1900) was developing a new concept of soil. The Russian workers conceived of soils as independent natural bodies, each with unique properties resulting from a unique combination of climate, living matter, parent material, relief, and time. They hypothesized that properties of each soil reflected the combined effects of the particular set of genetic factors responsible for the soil's formation. Hans Jenny later emphasized the functionally relatedness of soil properties and soil formation. The results of this work became generally available to Americans through the publication in 1914 of K.D. Glinka's textbook in German and especially through its translation into English by C.F. Marbut in 1927.

The Russian concepts were revolutionary. Properties of soils no longer were based wholly on inferences from the nature of the rocks or from climate or other environmental factors, considered singly or collectively; rather, by going directly to the soil itself, the integrated expression of all these factors could be seen in the morphology of the soils. This concept required that all properties of soils be considered collectively in terms of a completely integrated natural body. In short, it made possible a science of soil.

The early enthusiasm for the new concept and for the rising new discipline of soil science led some to suggest the study of soil could proceed without regard to the older concepts derived from geology and agricultural chemistry. Certainly the reverse is true. Besides laying the foundation for a soil science with its own principles, the new concept makes the other sciences even more useful. Soil morphology provides a firm basis on which to group the results of observation, experiments, and practical experience and to develop integrated principles that predict the behavior of the soils.

== Curtis Marbut ==
Under the leadership of C. F. Marbut, the Russian concept was broadened and adapted to conditions in the United States. This concept emphasized individual soil profiles to the subordination of external soil features and surface geology. By emphasizing soil profiles, however, soil scientists at first tended to overlook the natural variability of soils which can be substantial even within a small area. Overlooking the variability of soils seriously reduced the value of the maps which showed the location of the soils.

Furthermore, early emphasis on genetic soil profiles was so great as to suggest that material lacking a genetic profile, such as recent alluvium, was not soil. A sharp distinction was drawn between rock weathering and soil formation. Although a distinction between these sets of processes is useful for some purposes, rock and mineral weathering and soil formation are commonly indistinguishable.

The concept of soil was gradually broadened and extended during the years following 1930, essentially through consolidation and balance. The major emphasis had been on the soil profile. After 1930, morphological studies were extended from single pits to long trenches or a series of pits in an area of a soil. The morphology of a soil came to be described by ranges of properties deviating from a central concept instead of by a single "typical" profile. The development of techniques for mineralogical studies of clays also emphasized the need for laboratory studies.

Marbut emphasized strongly that classification of soils should be based on morphology instead of on theories of soil genesis, because theories are both ephemeral and dynamic. He perhaps overemphasized this point to offset other workers who assumed that soils had certain characteristics without examining the soils. Marbut tried to make clear that examination of the soils themselves was essential in developing a system of Soil Classification and in making usable soil maps. In spite of this, Marbut's work reveals his personal understanding of the contributions of geology to soil science. His soil classification of 1935 depends heavily on the concept of a "normal soil", the product of equilibrium on a landscape where downward erosion keeps pace with soil formation.

Clarification and broadening of the concept of a soil science also grew out of the increasing emphasis on detailed soil mapping. Concepts changed with increased emphasis on predicting crop yields for each kind of soil shown on the maps. Many of the older descriptions of soils had not been quantitative enough and the units of classification had been too heterogeneous for making yield and management predictions needed for planning the management of individual farms or fields.

During the 1930s, soil formation was explained in terms of loosely conceived processes, such as "podzolization", "laterization", and "calcification". These were presumed to be unique processes responsible for the observed common properties of the soils of a region.

== Hans Jenny ==
In 1941 Hans Jenny's (1899–1992) Factors of Soil Formation: A System of Quantitative Pedology concisely summarized and illustrated many of the basic principles of modern soil science to that date. Since 1940, time has assumed much greater significance among the factors of soil formation, and geomorphological studies have become important in determining the time that soil material at any place has been subjected to soil-forming processes. Meanwhile, advances in soil chemistry, soil physics, soil mineralogy, and soil biology, as well as in the basic sciences that underlie them, have added new tools and new dimensions to the study of soil formation. As a consequence, the formation of soil has come to be treated as the aggregate of many interrelated physical, chemical, and biological processes. These processes are subject to quantitative study in soil physics, soil chemistry, soil mineralogy, and soil biology. The focus of attention also has shifted from the study of gross attributes of the whole soil to the co-varying detail of individual parts, including grain-to-grain relationships.

== Guy Smith ==
In both the classification of Marbut and the 1938 classification developed by the U.S. Department of Agriculture, the classes were described mainly in qualitative terms. Classes were not defined in quantitative terms that would permit consistent application of the system by different scientists. Neither system definitely linked the classes of its higher categories, largely influenced by genetic concepts initiated by the Russian soil scientists, to the soil series and their subdivisions that were used in soil mapping in the United States. Both systems reflected the concepts and theories of soil genesis of the time, which were themselves predominantly qualitative in character. Modification of the 1938 system in 1949 corrected some of its deficiencies but also illustrated the need for a reappraisal of concepts and principles. More than 15 years of work under the leadership of Guy D. Smith culminated in a new soil classification system. This became the official classification system of the U.S. National Cooperative Soil Survey in 1965 and was published in 1975 as Soil Taxonomy: A Basic System of Soil Classification for Making and Interpreting Soil Surveys. The Smith system was adopted in the U.S. and many other nations for their own classification system.

Another factor has had an immense impact on soil survey, especially during the 1960s. Before 1950, the primary applications of soil surveys were farming, ranching, and forestry. Applications for highway planning were recognized in some States as early as the late 1920s, and soil interpretations were placed in field manuals for highway engineers of some States during the 1930s and 1940s. Nevertheless, the changes in soil surveys during this period were mainly responses to the needs of farming, ranching, and forestry. During the 1950s and 1960s nonfarm uses of the soil increased rapidly. This created a great need for information about the effects of soils on those nonfarm uses.

== Bioturbation ==
A major re-evaluation of soil formation and the role of biota commenced in the 1980s, as soil-geomorphologists began to re-evaluate Charles Darwin's and Nathaniel Shaler's early ideas on the role of bioturbation in soil formation. There is now ample evidence to support Darwin's conclusions, and in many areas biota that burrow in soil are major agents of pedogenesis.

== Soil organic matter ==
Soil organic matter is significantly different than understood by soil science prior to the 21st century. Flaws in the established paradigm were made apparent in 1999 when soil models could not accommodate the large charcoal component present in Chernozems. In 2016 soil science textbooks began addressing the need to abandon long-accepted, but now outdated, concepts.

As of 2021, few yet understand that the classic textbook theory of soil organic matter accumulation "has been proven mostly false".

== See also ==
- List of Russian Earth scientists

== Literature ==
- Agafonoff V., 1926. Quelques réflexions sur l'histoire de la pédologie // Annales de la science agronomique française et étrangère. Vol. 43. P. 132–153.
- Soil Survey Staff, 1993. Soil Survey: Early Concepts of Soil. (html) Soil Survey Manual USDA Handbook 18, Soil Conservation Service. U.S. Department of Agriculture. URL accessed on 2004-11-30.
- Darwin, C., 1881, The formation of vegetable mould through the action of worms, with observations on their habits: London, John Murray
- Shaler, N. S., 1891, The origin and nature of soils, in Powell, J. W., ed., USGS 12th Annual report 1890-1891: Washington, D.C., Government Printing Office, p. 213-45.
- Paton, T. R., Humphreys, G. S., and Mitchell, P. B., 1995, Soils: A New Global View: London, UCL Press Limited
- Johnson, D. L., 1990, Biomantle evolution and the redistribution of earth materials and artifacts: Soil Science, v. 149, p. 84–102.
- Humphreys, G. S., and Mitchell, P. B., 1983, A preliminary assessment of the role of bioturbation and rainwash on sandstone hillslopes in the Sydney Basin, in Australian and New Zealand Geomorphology Group, p. 66–80.
- Wilkinson, M. T., and Humphreys, G. S., 2005, Exploring pedogenesis via nuclide-based soil production rates and OSL-based bioturbation rates: Australian Journal of Soil Research, v. 43, p. 767–779.
