= Curtis F. Marbut =

American soil scientist (1863–1935)

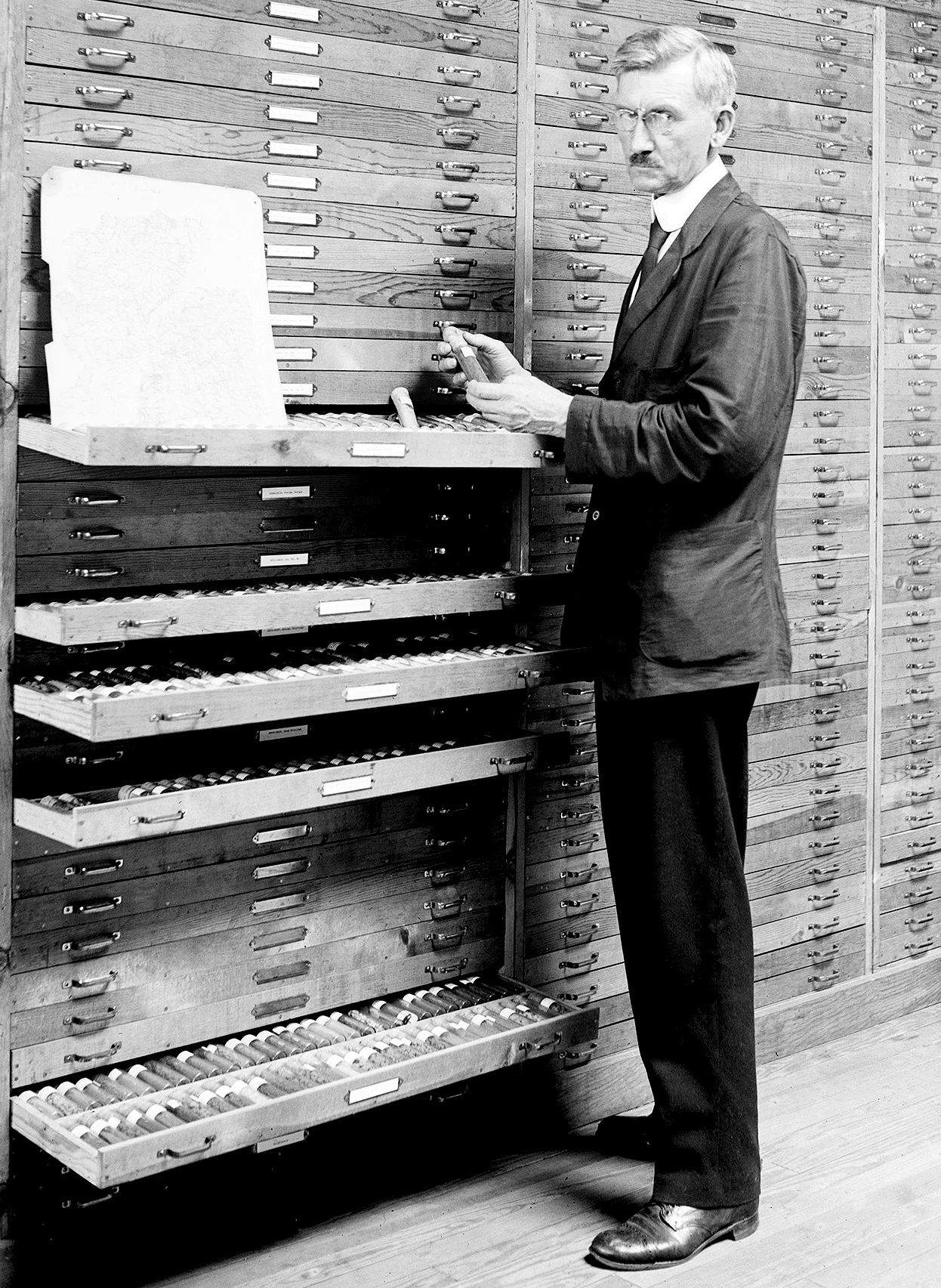
Curtis Marbut and US soil samples, 1922

Curtis Fletcher Marbut (1863–1935) served as Director of the Soil Survey Division of the U.S. Department of Agriculture from 1913 until his death in 1935. Marbut developed the first formal soil classification scheme for the United States.

Marbut was born and raised in Barry County, Missouri. He obtained a Bachelor of Science degree from the University of Missouri in 1889 and a Master of Arts degree from Harvard University in 1894. (He never sat for his final PhD exams at Harvard.) Marbut taught Physiography and Geology at the University of Missouri from 1895 until 1910, and also worked for the Missouri Geologic Survey and directed the Missouri Soil Survey.

In 1910, Marbut went to work as a soil scientist in the Bureau of Soils of the U.S. Department of Agriculture, where he continued until his death in 1935. Marbut became Director of the Soil Survey Division in 1913. Marbut died of pneumonia in 1935 while en route to an assignment in China advising the Chinese Geological Survey on organizing a soil survey.

As a geologist and geographer his initial view was that soils were surface reflections of the geology below them, but came to recognize that soil science is distinct from geology. Eugene W. Hilgard of the University of California and Hopkins of the University of Illinois greatly influenced this change of view. The land-grant universities had always been close partners in National Cooperative Soil Surveys and by 1920 most soil surveyors were graduates of these universities and other agricultural colleges with training in soils and crops.

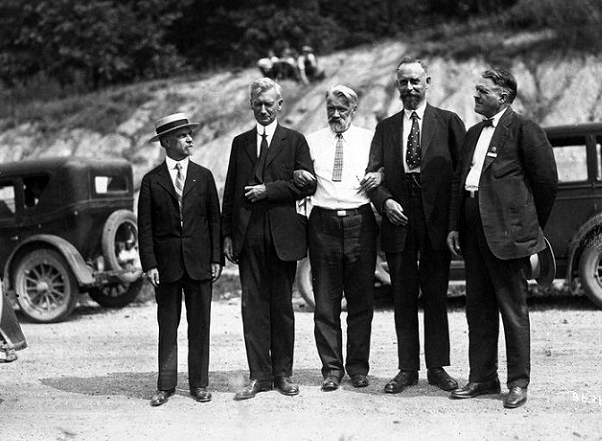
Curtis Marbut (second) and Konstantin Glinka (third) on International Congress of Soil Science, 1927

In 1920 Marbut began his work on a soil classification scheme. In 1927 he published a translation of Glinka's The Great Soil Groups of the World and their Development from German to English. His classification scheme became the 1935 system that was modified and published in the 1938 Yearbook of Agriculture, Soils and Men: the 1938 USDA soil taxonomy. At the highest level of classification the soils were divided into pedocals and pedalfers. Pedocals were used in the drier climates and referred to the carbonate rich soils. The pedalfers began about at the udic border and referred to soils rich in aluminium (alumen) and iron (ferrous). "Alfer" became the root term for alfisols.

== See also ==
- National Cooperative Soil Survey
- History of soil science
