= Friedrich Albert Fallou =

German agronomist (1794–1877)

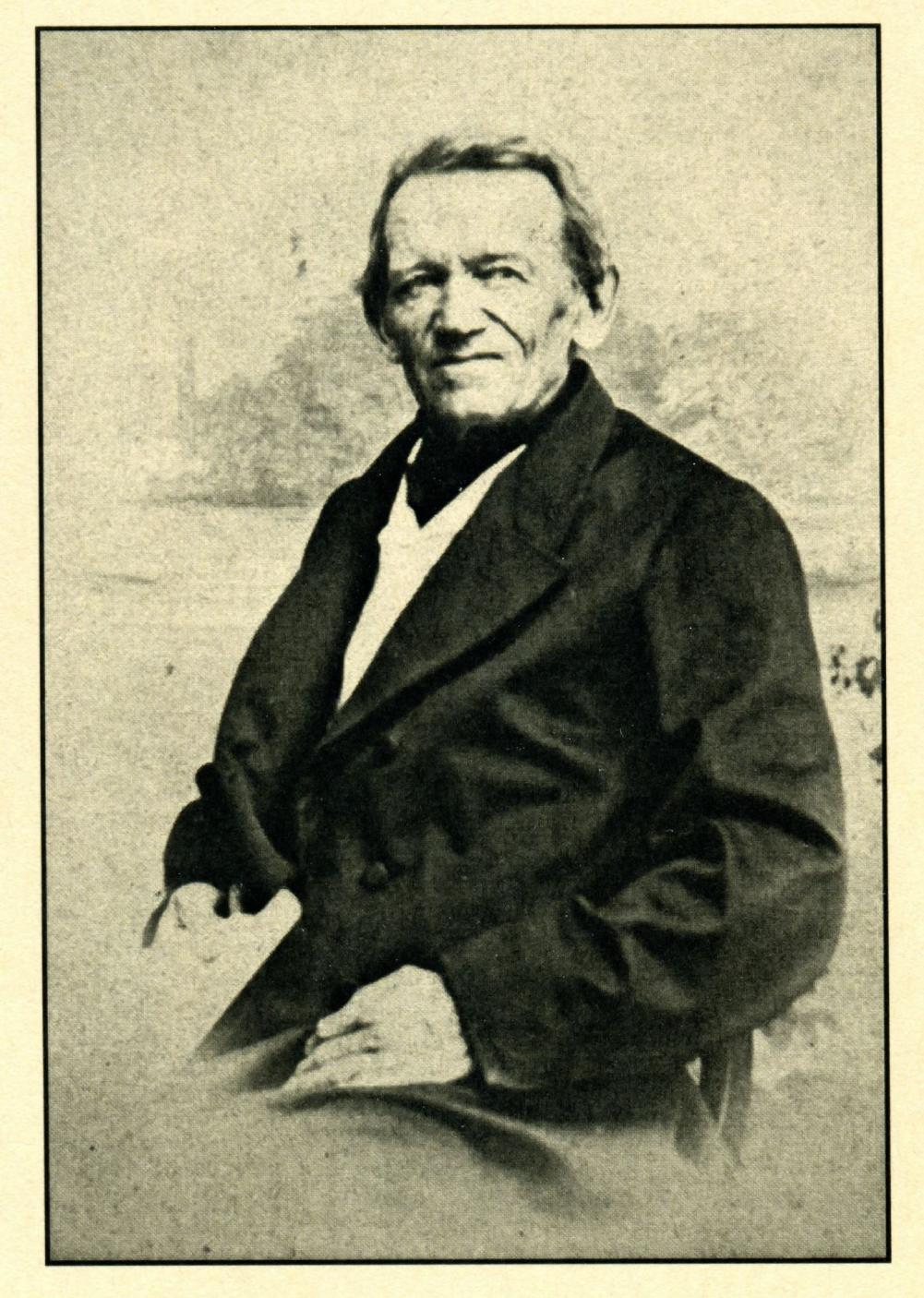
- Born: 11 November 1794; Zörbig, Saxony-Anhalt, Holy Roman Empire
- Died: 6 September 1877 (aged 82) der Diedenmühle near Waldheim, Saxony, Germany
- Education: University of Leipzig
- Occupations: Lawyer; Geologist
- Known for: Founder of Pedology

Friedrich Albert Fallou (11 November 1794 – 6 September 1877) was a German lawyer who is considered one of the founders of modern soil science. While working as a lawyer and tax assessor, Fallou established himself as an independent scientist and a recognized authority in the natural history of farm and forest soil. In 1862, he proposed that soil was separate in nature from geology and, intent on establishing the study of soils as an independent science, Fallou introduced the term pedology (German: pedologie).

== Life ==
Friedrich Albert Fallou came from an aristocratic French Huguenot family. He was the son of a judicial bailiff, and spent his childhood in Rochlitz and Grimma, where he studied at the Gymnasium St. Augustine. He never married. From 1814 to 1817, Fallou studied jurisprudence at the University of Leipzig. From 1818 to 1824, he worked as a lawyer in Colditz. In 1825, he was appointed town clerk of Waldheim and worked as an administrative officer at the City Court and a land value tax assessor. His interest in nature led him to study soils as an independent scholar. He also wrote geographic descriptions of Saxon regions and towns, which he published in the journal Saxonia, under the pseudonym "Baldwin from Eichberg". In 1833, he resigned as city clerk and again ran a practice as a lawyer and worked as a land evaluator until 1850. After that, Fallou devoted himself almost exclusively to geological, mineralogical, and pedological studies. In 1856, he moved to the Diedenmühle near Waldheim in Saxony, living here as an independent scientist until his death.

== Work ==
Working in soil evaluation for most of his professional life, Fallou became concerned with the declining soil quality in his region and developed a passionate interest in soil. In the 1830s, Fallou conducted geological, petrographic and mineralogical studies as an independent scholar. He had a particular interest in the granulite geology near Prachatice on the eastern edge of the Bohemian Forest. In the years after 1840, he devoted his time to the origin of agricultural and forest soils. His first major publication was a description of the rock formations of Muldengaues and their influence on vegetation, published in 1845. It received an award from the Princely Jablonowski'schen Society in Leipzig.

In 1853, he published his book The Arable lands of the Kingdom of Saxony, with a second edition in 1855. Through numerous study trips in Saxony and neighboring countries, Fallou recognized the need to make soil science knowledge applicable to agriculture and forestry.

In his two books, First Principles of Soil Science (1857, 2nd ed. 1865) and Pedology or General and Special Soil Science"(1862), he developed his collected field observations of soil into a systematic approach. He explained why soil formation was worthy of study and appealed for recognition of soil science as a discipline. In the 1862 work, he presented a proposal for soil profile description, discussed the physical and chemical properties of soils, and proposed a classification of soils based on mineral properties. Based on these two works, Fallou is prominently mentioned as the first among the founders of modern soil science.

Fallou's subsequent works were The Land of the Kingdom of Saxony and its Surroundings ...(1869) and The Main Soil Types of the North and Baltic Countries of the German Empire Scientifically Considered" (1875). These, along with several articles published in Julius Adolph Stöckhardt's magazine Zeitschrift für deutsche Landwirthe (Journal for German Farmers), gained him recognition for his scientific advancements.

Vasily Dokuchaev (1846-1903) was more influential than Fallou. However, in the years closely following Dokuchaev's death, Fallou was regarded as the founder of modern soil science by Dokuchaev's student, the influential Russian pedologist Konstantin Dmitrievich Glinka (1867-1927). Fallou's historical status as founder is supported by Moscow soil scientist and bibliographer of Russian soil science, Arseny Yarilov, Editor of Pochvovedenie (Eurasian Soil Science). Yarilov titled his 1904 article about Fallou in Pochvovedenie Friedrich Albert Fallou, Founder of Soil Science.

== Quotes ==
Note: all quotes from Pedology or General and Special Soil Science, Dresden 1862. Translation by Google Translate.

- Die naturwiſſenſchaftliche Bodenkunde (Pedologie) iſt eine Naturbeſchreibung des Bodens ohne Rückſicht auf ſein Verhältniß zur Pflanzenwelt, und ohne ſich dabei um ſeine Nutzanwendung zu gewerblichen Zwecken zu kümmern.
  - The science of soil science (pedology) is a natural description of the soil regardless of its relation to the plant world, and without worring about its utility for commercial purposes.
- Die landwirthſchaftliche Bodenkunde (Agrologie) iſt die Kenntniß des Bodens in ſeiner Beziehung zur Pflanze und landwirthſchaftlichen Nutzung. Sie hat es blos mit dem urbaren, oder zum Landbau geeigneten Boden zu thun und iſt inſofern gewiſſermaßen eine Lithurgik des Bodens, denn um nutzbare Pflanzen darauf zu erzielen, muß er erſt künſtlich zugerichtet werden, er geſtattet keine unmittelbare Verwendung, wie der Brnchſtein zum Hausbau.
  - Agricultural soil science (agrology) is the knowledge of the soil in its relation to the plant and agricultural use. It has only to do with arable land suitable for agriculture, and in a way of speaking it is a kind of liturgy of the soil, for in order to grow usable plants upon it, it must first be artificially prepared; it does not permit any direct use, as rough stone does for building a house.
- Es giebt ja in der ganzen Natur keinen wichtigeren, keinen der Betrachtung würdigeren Gegenstand und wenn ein berühmter Philosoph und Staatsmann der Vorzeit (Cic. de off. I. 42.) den Ackerbau für das würdigste Geschäft eines freien Bürgers erklärt, so muß es auch ein ebenso würdiges Geschäft für ihn sein, sich mit dem Boden bekannt zu machen, ohne welchen kein Ackerbau denkbar.
  - There is no more important object in nature, no object more worthy of contemplation, and if a famous philosopher and statesman of the past declares agriculture to be the worthy business of a free citizen (Cic. de off. I. 42.) it would also be an equally worthy business for him to get acquainted with the soil, without which agriculture is not conceivable.
    - References the Cicero quote, omnium autem rerum, ex quibus aliquid adquiritur, nihil est agri cultura melius, nihil uberius, nihil dulcius, nihil homine libero dignius. (For of all gainful professions, nothing is better, nothing more pleasing, nothing more delightful, nothing better becomes a well-bred man than agriculture.) - Cicero De officiis (On Dutiable Action). Book I, Section 42. Translation by Cyrus R. Edmonds (1873), p.73
- Hat ſich überhaupt die Naturforſchung bisher nicht blos auf jene Naturproducte beſchränkt, welche das wahre, oder eingebildete Bedürfniß der Menſchen befriedigen, ſondern über das ganze ungezählte Heer der Weſen erſtreckt, ſo kann auch der Boden, die Geburtsſtätte und erſte Grundbedingung ſo vieler Weſen, für den Naturforſcher keine unwürdige Aufgabe ſeiner Unterſuchung ſein. Bietet ihm doch dieſer todte Trümmerſchutt, dieſer, jetzt unter einem Teppich wallender Saaten verhüllte große Felsruine nicht weniger Stoff zum Nachdenken dar, als die unter ihr begrabenen Reliquien der Vorwelt, die verſteinerten Skelette ausgeſtorbener Their und Pflanzengeſchlechter. Grund- und Deckengebirge liegen vor uns, wie eine Sphinx, welche uns zu rathen aufgiebt, und wen ſollte es nicht freuen, wenn er eines ihrer Räthſel löſen kann?
  - So far natural science has not confined itself only to those natural products which satisfy the true or imagined needs of men but extend over the whole innumerable host of beings; thus the soil, the birthplace, and the first basic condition of so many beings, can be a worthy task of a naturalist's investigation. But this dead rubble, this great rock ruin, now shrouded under a carpet of billowing seeds, offers no less food for thought than the relics of the previous world buried beneath it, the petrified skeletons of extinct animals and plant species. Ground and vaulted mountains stand before us, like a sphinx, inviting us to guess, and who should not rejoice if he can solve one of their riddles?

== Works ==
- Fallou, F. A. (1845), Die Gebirgsformationen zwischen Mittweida und Rochlitz, der Zschopau und beiden Mulden und ihr Einfluß auf die Vegetation. Versuch einer geognostischen-agronomischen Beschreibung [The mountain formations between Mittweida and Rochlitz, the Zschopau and two troughs, and their influence on vegetation. Attempt a geo-agronomic description] (in German), Leipzig: Staritz
- Fallou, F. A. (1853), Die Ackererden des Königreichs Sachsen und der angrenzenden Gegend, geognostisch untersucht und classificiert. Eine bodenkundliche Skizze [The arable earth of the Kingdom of Saxony and the neighboring area, geology examined and classified. A soil sketch] (in German), Leipzig: Freiberg, "2nd edition published by Gerhard"
- Fallou, F. A. (1857), Anfangsgründe der Bodenkunde [First Principles of Soil Science] (in German), Dresden: G. Schönfeld´s Buchhandlung, "2nd edition published 1865"
- Fallou, F. A. (1862), Pedologie oder allgemeine und besondere Bodenkunde [Pedology or general and special soil science] (in German), Dresden: G. Schönfeld´s Buchhandlung
- Fallou, F. A. (1869), Grund und Boden des Königreichs Sachsen und seiner Umgebung in sämmtlichen Nachbarstaaten in volks-, land- und forstwirthschaftlicher Beziehung naturwissenschaftlich untersucht [Land of the Kingdom of Saxony and all neighboring regions, scientifically studied in relationship to folks, lands, and forestry] (in German), Dresden: G. Schönfeld´s Buchhandlung
- Fallou, F. A. (1875), Die Hauptbodenarten der Nord- und Ostsee-Länder deutschen Reiches naturwissenschaftlich betrachtet. Skizze [The main soil types of the North and Baltic countries of the German Empire scientifically considered. Sketch] (in German), Dresden: G. Schönfeld´s Buchhandlung
