= Pedocal =

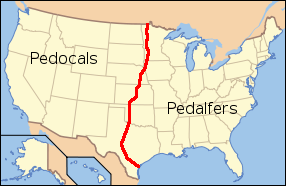
Marbut's Pedocal/Pedalfer boundary lies near the 98 meridian and 30 inches annual precipitation. (after Marbut, 1935)

Pedocal is a subdivision of the zonal soil order. It is a class of soil which forms in semiarid and arid regions. It is rich in calcium carbonate and has low soil organic matter. With only a thin A horizon (topsoil), and intermittent precipitation calcite, other soluble minerals ordinarily removed by water may build up in the B horizon (subsoil) forming a cemented layer known as caliche. It is not used in the current United States system of soil classification but the term commonly shows up in college geology texts.

== See also ==
- Pedalfer
- USDA soil taxonomy
