= Pedalfer =

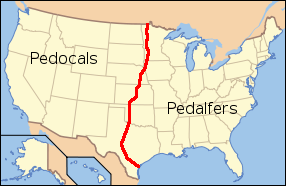
Marbut's Pedocal/Pedalfer boundary lies near the 98 meridian and 30 inches annual precipitation. (after Marbut, 1935)

Pedalfer is composed of aluminum and iron oxides. It is a subdivision of the zonal soil order comprising a large group of soils in which sesquioxides increase relative to silica during soil formation. Pedalfers usually occur in humid areas. It is not used in the current United States system of soil classification but the term commonly shows up in college geology texts.

Pedalfers have three subdivisions of which one is Lateritic soils.

Pedalfer is a formative element in the United States soil taxonomic system for the Alfisols soil order. Alf is the formative element in the Alfisol name, and refers to aluminium (Al) and iron (Fe).

== See also ==
- Pedocal
- USDA soil taxonomy
