= 1938 USDA soil taxonomy =

Early classification system of soils in the US

The 1938 soil taxonomy divided soils into three orders dependent on dominant soil forming factors.

== Intrazonal soils ==
Intrazonal soils have more or less well-defined soil profile characteristics that reflect the dominant influence of some resident factor of relief or parent material over the classic zonal effects of climate and vegetation. There are three major sub-types, two of which have two further sub-types each.

Calcimorphic or calcareous soils develop from a limestone. It has two sub-types:

Rendzina soils are thin soils with limited available water capacity.
Terra rossa soils are deep red soils associated with higher rainfall than rendzina.

Hydromorphic soils form in wetland conditions. There are two sub-types:

Gley soils - These occur when the pore spaces between the grains become saturated with water and contain no air. This lack of oxygen leads to anaerobic conditions which reduce the iron in the parent rock. This gives the soil a characteristic grey/blue colour with flecks of red.
Peat soils form under circumstances that prevent the breakdown of vegetation completely.

Halomorphic soils form due to soil salination.

== Azonal soil ==
These soils are formed in mountainous regions out of fine grains produced by weathering. However, due to various reasons, this fine grained material constantly slides down the slope. As a result, the time necessary for the formation of soils does not become available. Therefore, these soils remain immature. An example is soil along the slopes of the Himalayan mountains. In river plains, particularly in flood-plain areas, new alluvium is deposited every year. The time for soil formation remains inadequate. Hence, flood plain soils also remain immature. In river plains, due to alluvium and availability of water, the farmlands are fertile but the soils remain immature.

== See also ==
- Red Mediterranean soil
