= Konstantin Glinka =

Russian and Soviet mineralogist and soil scientist

Konstantin Dmitrievich Glinka
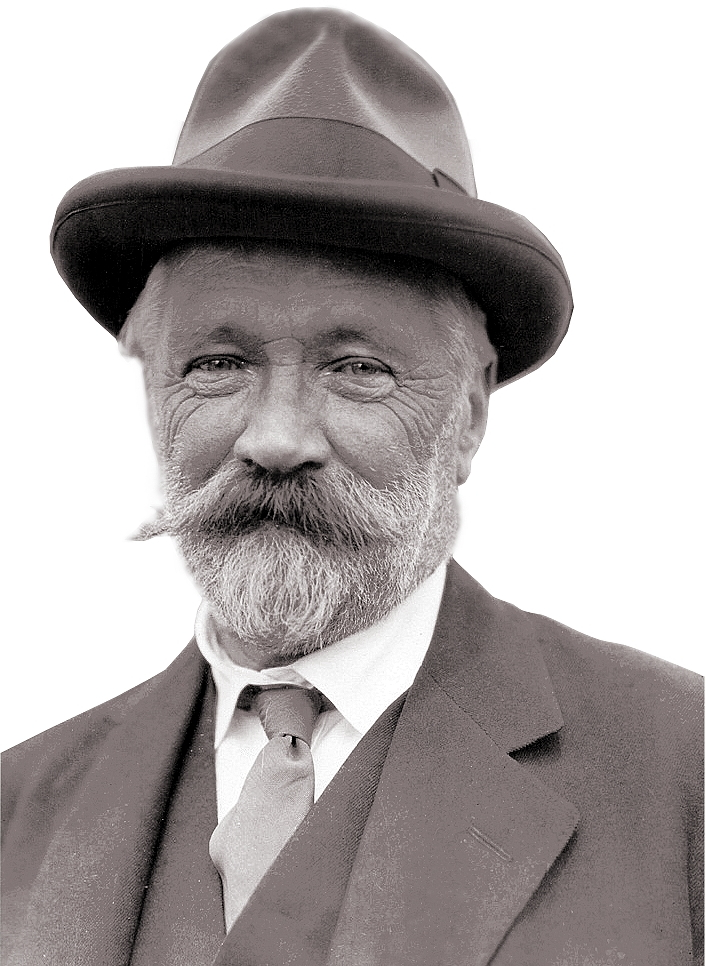
- Born: 23 June 1867; Koptevo, Dukhovshchinsky Uyezd, Smolensk Governorate, Russian Empire
- Died: 2 November 1927 (aged 60); Leningrad, Russian SFSR, Soviet Union
- Occupation: Soil Science
- Awards: 1900 - Order of Saint Anna, 2nd Class; Order of Saint Stanislaus (Russian), 2nd class 1910 - Order of Saint Anna, 3rd Class.

Academic background
- Education: Saint Petersburg State University
- Doctoral advisor: Vasily V. Dokuchaev

Signature
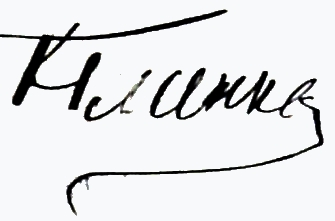

Konstantin Dmitrievich Glinka (Russian: Константи́н Дми́триевич Гли́нка) (1867–1927) was a Russian soil scientist. He was Director of the Agricultural College of Leningrad and Experimental Station, and the first director of the Dokuchaev Soil Science Institute. He authored over 150 works on soil, geography, mineralogy, and geology. He is known for having published the first world soil map in 1906.

== Biography ==
Konstantin Glinka was born on June 23 (July 5), 1867 (sometimes indicated on August 1 (Julian calendar)), in the village of Koptevo, Dukhovshchinsky Uyezd, Smolensk province, Russian Empire. He came from a Russian noble family with Polish roots.

His father, the nobleman Dmitry Konstantinovich Glinka, was a respected and progressive figure. He had an estate and was very successful in farming, skills which Glinka's father passed on along his son.

After graduating from St. Petersburg University in 1889 he married Antonina Georgievna Znamenskaya.

Upon returning home to Leningrad from the First International Soil Congress to the USA in 1927, he fell ill and died on November 2, 1927. He is buried at the Shuvalov cemetery in St. Petersburg.

== Career ==
In 1876-1885 he studied at the Smolensk classical gymnasium.

In 1885 he entered the Natural Department of the Faculty of Physics and Mathematics of St. Petersburg University.

In 1889 he graduated from the University with a diploma of the 1st degree. At the request of V. V. Dokuchaev, Glinka joined the Mineralogy Department to prepare for a professorship.

In 1889 he began to engage in geological and soil research at the University under the guidance of V. B. Dokuchaev. He worked in the Poltava (1889-1890) and in the expedition of the Forest Department (1892). He organized research in Smolensk, Novgorod (early 1890s), Pskov (1898-1899) and Voronezh (1899, 1913) provinces.

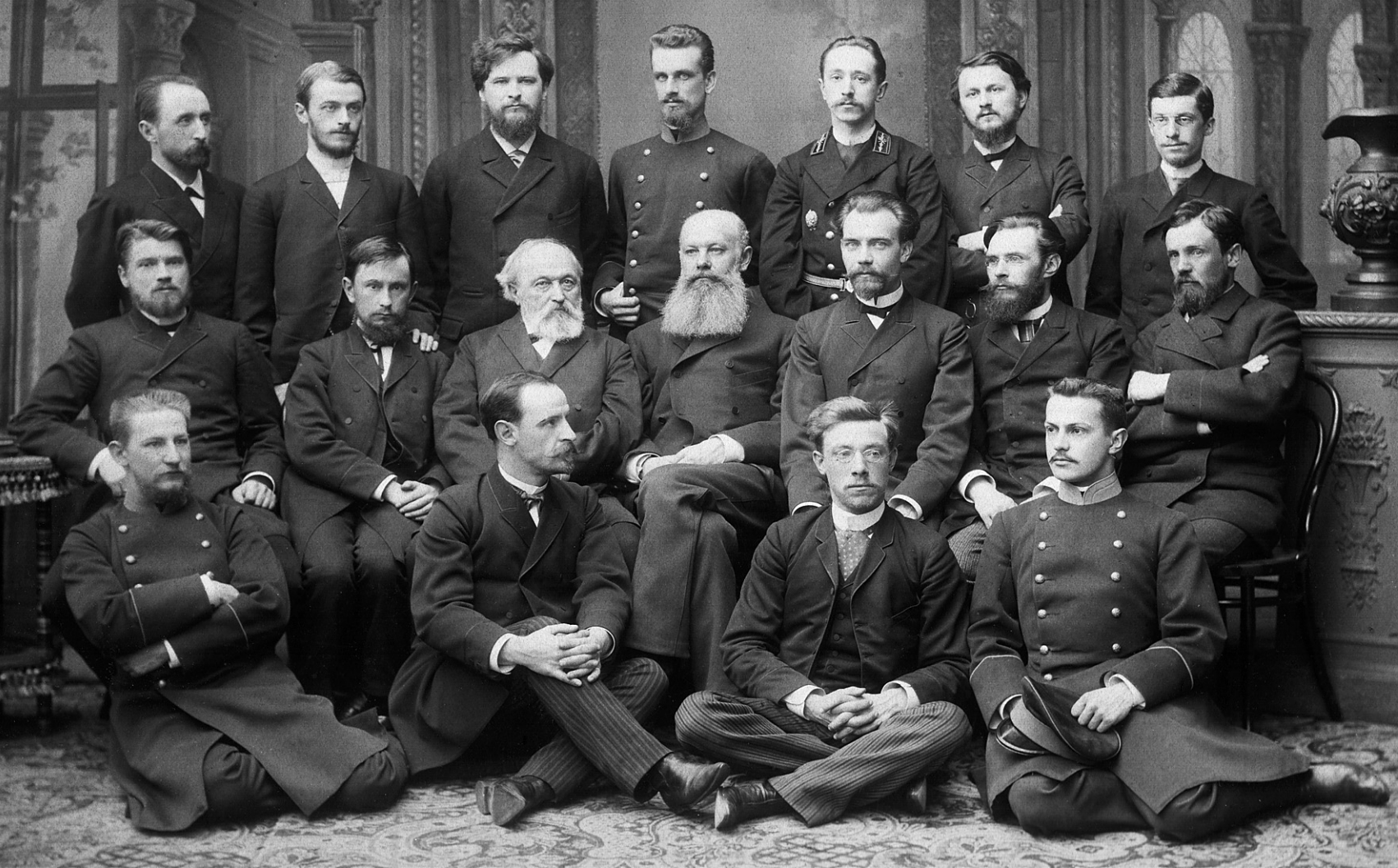
Students of A. V. Sovetov and V. V. Dokuchaev, members of the Poltava expedition of V. V. Dokuchaev. K. D. Glinka is seated first on the left in the middle row. Photo was taken in 1892 or 1893

In 1890 he was appointed curator of the mineralogical collection at the University.

From 1890 he conducted practical classes with students of the 1st and 2nd courses in crystallography and crystal optics.

In 1894 K. D. Glinka, on the recommendation of V. V. Dokuchaev, was appointed staff assistant at the New Alexandria Institute of Agriculture and Forestry in Puławy (Poland) as an assistant in the Department of Mineralogy and Geology.

In 1896 he completed his Master's Thesis: "Glauconite, its origin, chemical composition and nature of weathering."

After defending his thesis, he was appointed professor of the same department. At the same time, he is acting as a professor of soil science, teaching in the stead of N.M. Sibirtseva who had taken ill.

In 1900 became a professor of geology, and in 1901 professor of soil science. In 1901 he headed the Department of Soil Science.

In 1906 he became Head of Soil Survey of the Resettlement Administration.

In 1908, he published the first edition of his textbook on soil science. It included the first schematic soil map of the world. Dokuchaev published a soil map of the northern hemisphere in 1899.

Glinka was also appointed chairman of the professorial disciplinary court in 1908.

In 1909 he completed his Doctoral Thesis: "Research in the field of weathering processes."

In 1909 he attended the First Agrogeological Congress in Budapesy. From this point in his career, Glinka became increasingly involved in the international community of soil scientists.

In 1911 he moved to Saint Petersburg, where he opened a private docent course in soil science at the University.

In 1912 he was elected professor at the Bestuzhev Higher Courses for Women, where he lectured on soil science.

In 1913 he founded the Voronezh Agricultural Institute which then headed through 1919.

In 1915 he published the next edition of his soil science textbook. It included revised mapping. A shortened version was interpreted into German, and from German into English by Curtis F. Marbut. Glinka became very influential resulting in wide distribution of the ideas of the Russian school of soil science.

In 1922 he was appointed director and organizer of the Petrograd (later Leningrad) Agricultural Institute and professor of soil science.

In 1923 he became the head professor at the State Institute of Experimental Agronomy.

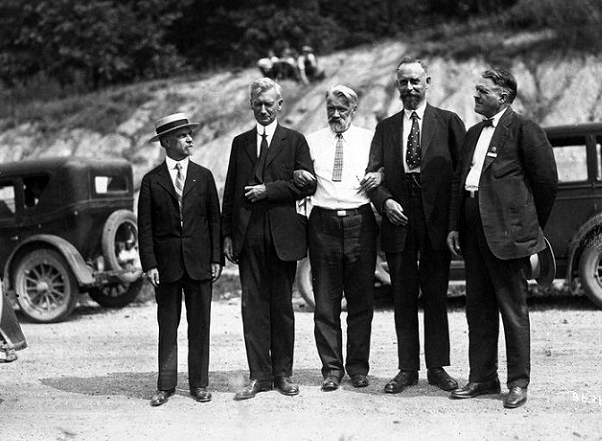
K. D. Glinka on an excursion to the USA. First International Soil Congress. 1927.

On January 2, 1926, K. D. Glinka was elected a corresponding member of the Academy of Sciences of the Soviet Union - Department of Physical and Mathematical Sciences (in the physical category).

On April 2, 1927, K. D. Glinka was elected a full member of the USSR Academy of Sciences in the Department of Physical and Mathematical Sciences (soil science). He became the first soil scientist elected to the Academy of Sciences of the USSR.

In the same year, he was appointed to head the V.V. Dokuchaev Soil Institute of the USSR Academy of Sciences.

In the summer of 1927 K. D. Glinka led the Soviet delegation to the First International Congress of Soil Scientists in Washington. He was elected president of the Second International Congress of Soil Scientists (this congress was held in 1930 in Moscow and was organized by Nikolai Vavilov).

== Awards and recognition ==
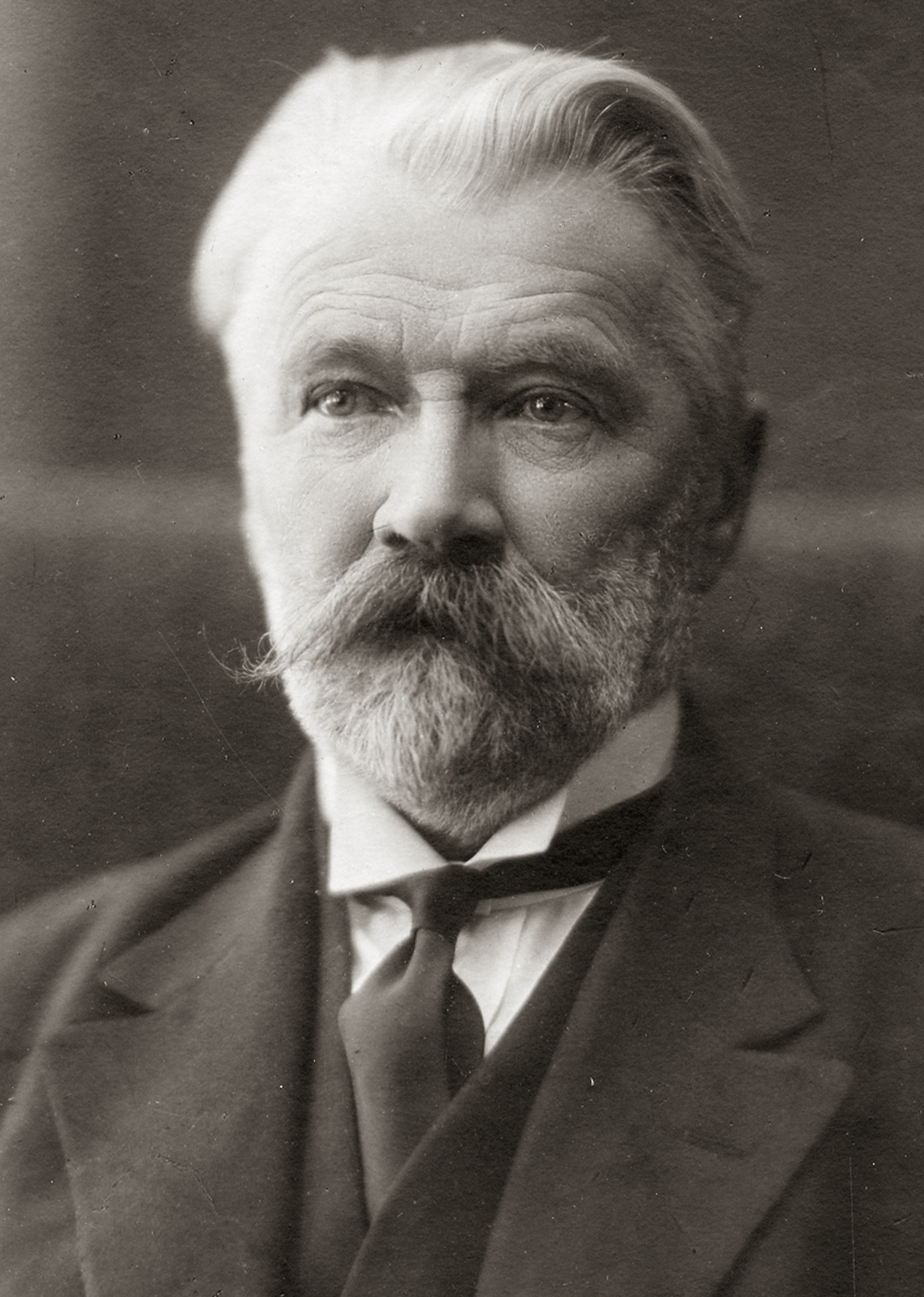
1927, Moscow

- 1898 - Order of the Double Dragon (Chinese) 2nd Class 3rd Grade
- 1900 - Order of Saint Anna 3rd degree
- 1910 - Order of Saint Anna 2nd degree
- - Order of Saint Stanislaus 2nd class
- - Russian Geographical Society awarded the Lütke Gold Medal to Glinka for his work on soil geography.

== Ranks and titles ==
- 1891 - Collegiate secretary with seniority, according to the University diploma of the 1st degree
- 1894 - Titular Councilor with seniority, for long service
- 1897 - Master of mineralogy and geology, in rank
- 1897 - Adjunct professor at the Novo-Alexandria Institute of Agriculture and Forestry, Department of Mineralogy and Geology
- 1898 - Collegiate assessor with seniority, for long service.
- 1900 - Professor of the Novo-Alexandria Institute of Agriculture and Forestry, Department of Mineralogy and Geology
- 1909 - State Councilor with seniority

== Organizations ==
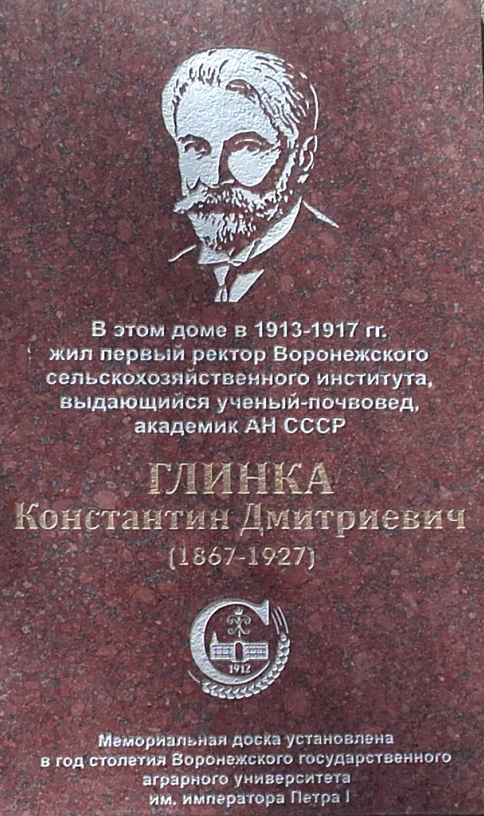
Memorial plaque at house, 12 st. Alekseevsky, in Voronezh

- Member of the Soil Commission under the Imperial Free Economic Society from 1889
- Member of the St. Petersburg Society of Naturalists from 1892
- Member of the State Institute of Experimental Agronomy
- Member of the Library Commission of the Institute (1899), Chairman of the Commission from 1900
- Member of Moscow Soil Committee
- Member of the Russian Mineralogical Society
- Member of the Russian Geographical Society
- Member of the Hungarian Geological Society
- Chairman of the Voronezh Committee for Assistance to Russian Prisoners of War
- Member of the Agronomic Society at the Leningrad Agricultural Institute
- Editor of the international magazine Internat Mitteluns für Boden from the first year of its publication
- Full member of the USSR Academy of Sciences in 1927
- Honorary Member of the International Union of Soil Sciences

== Memorials ==
- In the USSR, the name of K. D. Glinka was given to the Voronezh Agricultural Institute, where he was rector in 1913-1917 and 1921-1922. In 2011 the institute was renamed.
- A street in the Levoberezhny district of the city of Voronezh is named after K. D. Glinka.
- In 1990 a Memorial plaque was unveiled at house 12 on Alekseevsky street, located near the Voronezh State Agrarian University.

== Works ==
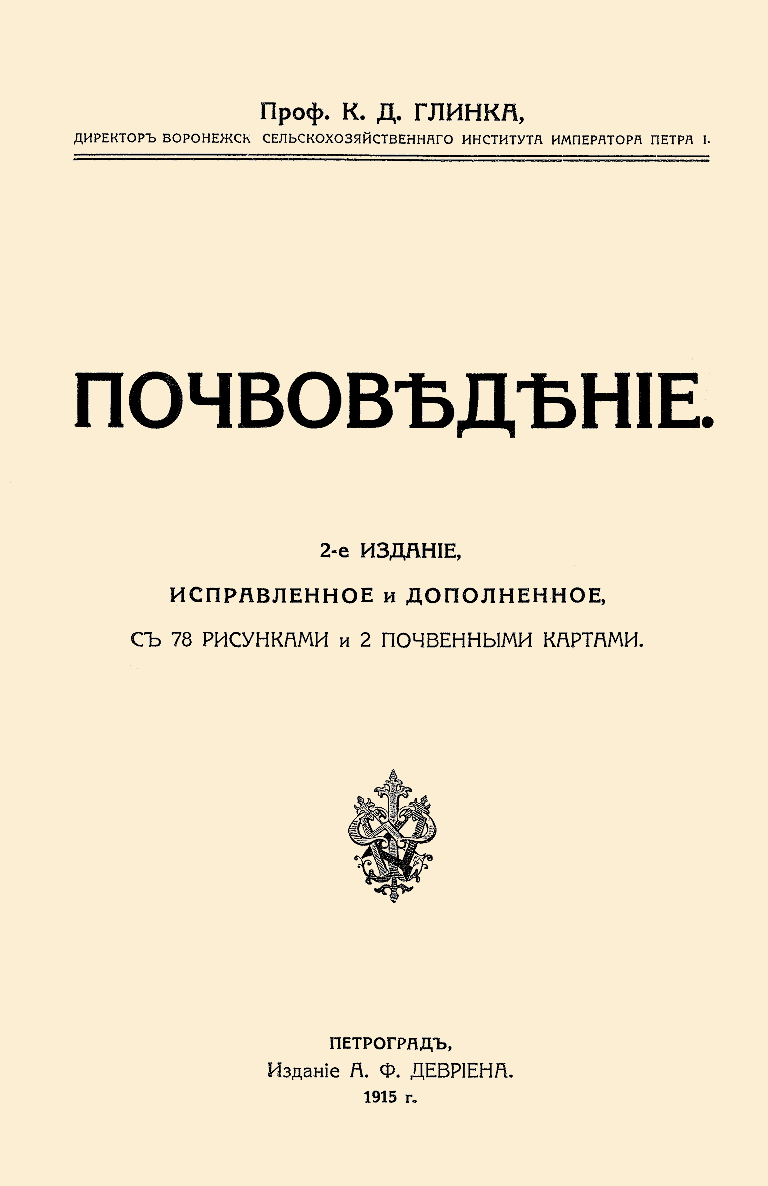
Textbook "Soil Science", 1915

From 1889 to 1927 Konstantin Glinka wrote about 100 scientific papers on soil science, mineralogy and geology in Russian, German, French and Italian.

- K voprosu o lesnykh pochvakh (К вопросу о лесных почвах) (1889) SPb.: tip. t-va Obshchestv. pol'za.
- Pochvennaya karta Rossiyskoy Imperii (Почвенная карта Российской Империи) (1914) Atlas Aziatskoy Rossii (Атлас Азиатской России). pages 36–37

== Bibliography ==
- Chirkin, Dmitry (2000). "Konstanty Glinka (1867-1927). Życie i działalność naukowa" [Konstantin Glinka (1867-1927). Life and scientific activity] (PDF). Kwartalnik Historii Nauki I Techniki. 45 (1): 87–102.
