= Vasily Dokuchaev =

Russian geologist and soil scientist (1846–1903)

Vasily V. Dokuchaev
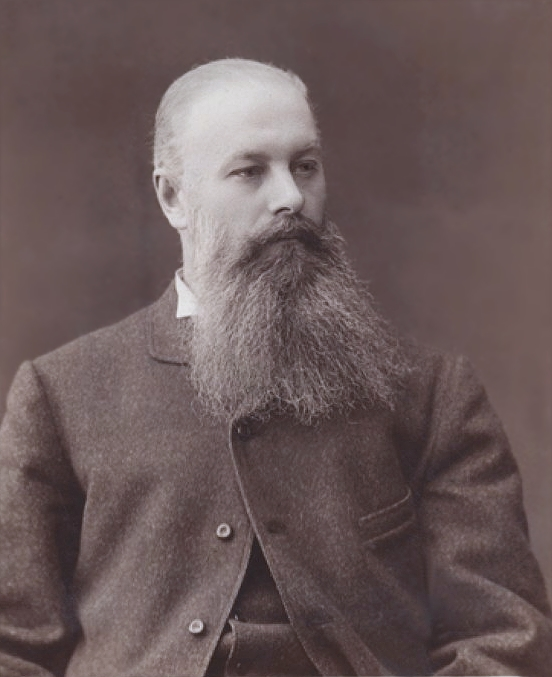
- V. Dokuchaev (Saint Petersburg, 1888)
- Born: 1 March 1846; Milyukovo, Sychyovsky Uyezd, Smolensk Governorate, Russian Empire
- Died: 8 November 1903 (aged 57); Saint Petersburg, Russian Empire
- Known for: Modern soil science founder
- Scientific career
- Fields: Geography, geology, soil science
- Workplaces: Saint Petersburg University

Signature
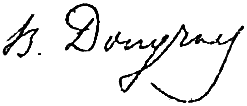

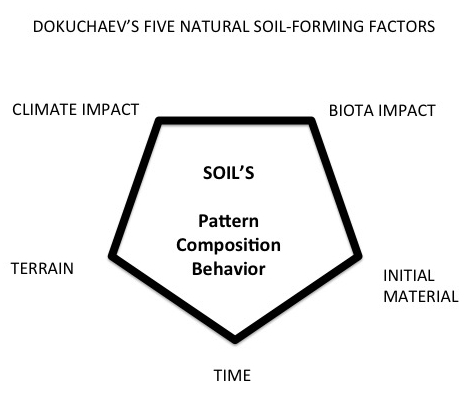
Dokuchaev's soil-formation factors

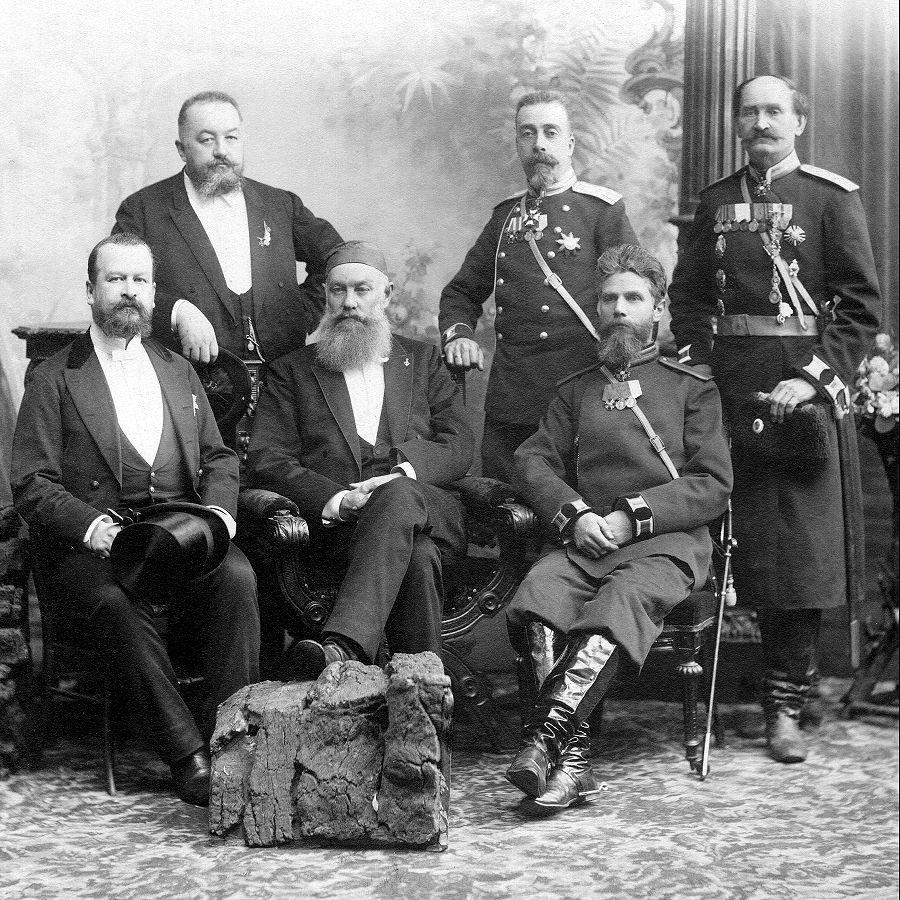
V. Dokuchaev, 1898

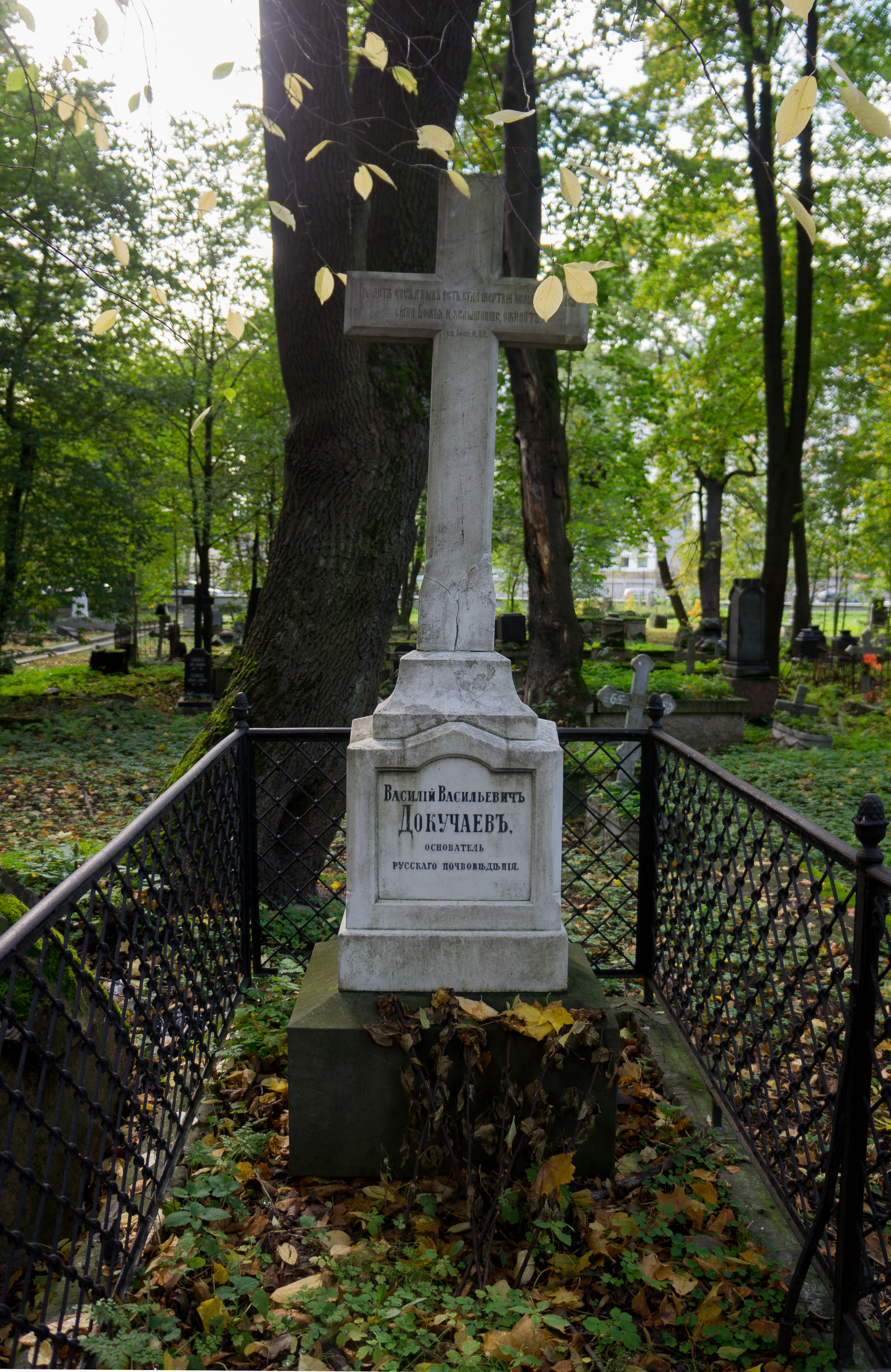
Grave.

Vasily Vasilyevich Dokuchaev (Russian: Васи́лий Васи́льевич Докуча́ев; 1 March 1846 – 8 November 1903) was a Russian geologist and geographer who is credited with laying the foundations of soil science. The Ukrainian city of Dokuchaievsk is named after him.

== Overview ==
Vasily Vasilevich Dokuchaev is commonly regarded as the father of soil science, the study of soils in their natural setting. He developed soil science in Russia and was perhaps the first to conduct broad geographical investigations of different soil types. His contribution to science figuratively "put soils on the map".

He introduced the idea that other variables could explain the geographical variations in soil type besides geological factors (parent material), such as climatic and topographic factors, and by the duration of pedogenesis (soil formation). He developed the very first soil classification, using these ideas as a starting point. His ideas were taken up by many soil scientists, including Hans Jenny.

Dokuchaev's work on soil science produced a system of soil classification that described five factors for soil formation. He arrived at his theory after extensive field studies on Russian soils in 1883. His most famous work is Russian Chernozem (1883). As a result of Dokuchaev's research, many Russian terms became part of the international soil science vocabulary (for example, chernozem, podsol, gley, solonets).

A crater on Mars is named after him, and the Dokuchaev Award, an equivalent of the Nobel Prize in the field of Soil Science, was instituted by the International Union of Soil Sciences in his honor.

== Quote ==
The scientific basis of soil science as a natural science was established by the classical works of Dokuchaev. Previously, soil had been considered a product of physicochemical transformations of rocks, a dead substrate from which plants derive nutritious mineral elements. Soil and bedrock were in fact equated.

Dokuchaev considers the soil as a natural body having its own genesis and its own history of development, a body with complex and multiform processes taking place within it. The soil is considered as different from bedrock. The latter becomes soil under the influence of a series of soil-formation factors (climate, vegetation, parent material, relief and age). According to him, soil should be called the "daily" or outward horizons of rocks regardless of the type; they are changed naturally by the common effect of water, air and various kinds of living and dead organisms.

== Authored works ==
Dokuchaev published in 1869-1901: 285 works, including 61 books and 4 maps.

List of publications (other than in Russian language)

- Dokoutchaief B. 1879. Tchernozème (terre noire) de la Russie d'Europe. St.-Ptb.: Soc. imp. libre économ. 66 p. (C.R. Soc. imp. libre économ. T. 4).
- Inostrantzev A., Schmidt Th., Moeller V., Karpinsky A., Dokoutchaief B. et al. 1882. Rapport de la Sous-commission russe sur l’uniformité de la nomenclature géologique // Congrès géologique international. 2-me session. Bologne. 1881: Compte rendu. Bologne: Fava et Garagnani. P. 529–534.
- Dokoutchaief B. B. 1892. Les steppes russes autrefois et aujurd’hui // Congrès international d'archéologie, préhistorique et d'antropologie. 11 ses. Moscou. 1892. T. 1. Мoscou: impr. universite, T. 1. P. 197–240; Our Steppes Before and Nowadays. St.-Ptb.: Dept. Agriculture Ministry of Crown Domains for the World's Columbian Exposition at Chicago, 1893. 62 p.
- Dokoutchaief B. B. 1892. Notes sur l’étude scientifique du sol en Russie au point de vue de l’agronomie et de la cartographie agricole // Bull. Soc. Belge géol., paleontol., hydrol. 1891/1892. Vol. 4. P. 113–115.
- Dokouchaev V. V. 1893. Notes sur le loess // Bull. Soc. Belge géol., paleontol., hydrol. 1892/1893. Vol. 6. P. 92-101.
- Dokouchaev V. V. Sibirtzev N. M. 1893. Short scientific review of professor Dockuchaev's and his pupil's collection of soils, exhibited in Chicago in the year 1893. St.-Ptb.: impr. Evdokimov. 40 p.
- Dokoutchaief B. B. 1895. Le Court contenu des Travaux de l’expédition, équipée par Departement forestier sous la direction prof. Dokoutschaeff. St.-Ptb.: impr. Evdokimov. 28 p.
- Docoutschaev V. V. 1897. Collection des sols du professeur Docoutschaev et de ses élèves, exposée au Musée minéralogique de l’Université de St-Petersbourg: [7 cong. géol. int.]. St.-Ptb.: impr. Evdokimov 17 p.
- Dokoutschaeff В. B. 1900. Collection pédologique: Zones verticales des sols. Zones agricoles. Sols du Caucase. St.-Ptb.: Ministére des finances. 56 p. : сarte.

Translations

- Dokuchaev, V. V. Russian Chernozem (1883) // Israel Program for Scientific Translations Ltd. (for USDA-NSF), S. Monson, Jerusalem, 1967. (Translated from Russian into English by N. Kaner).

== See also ==
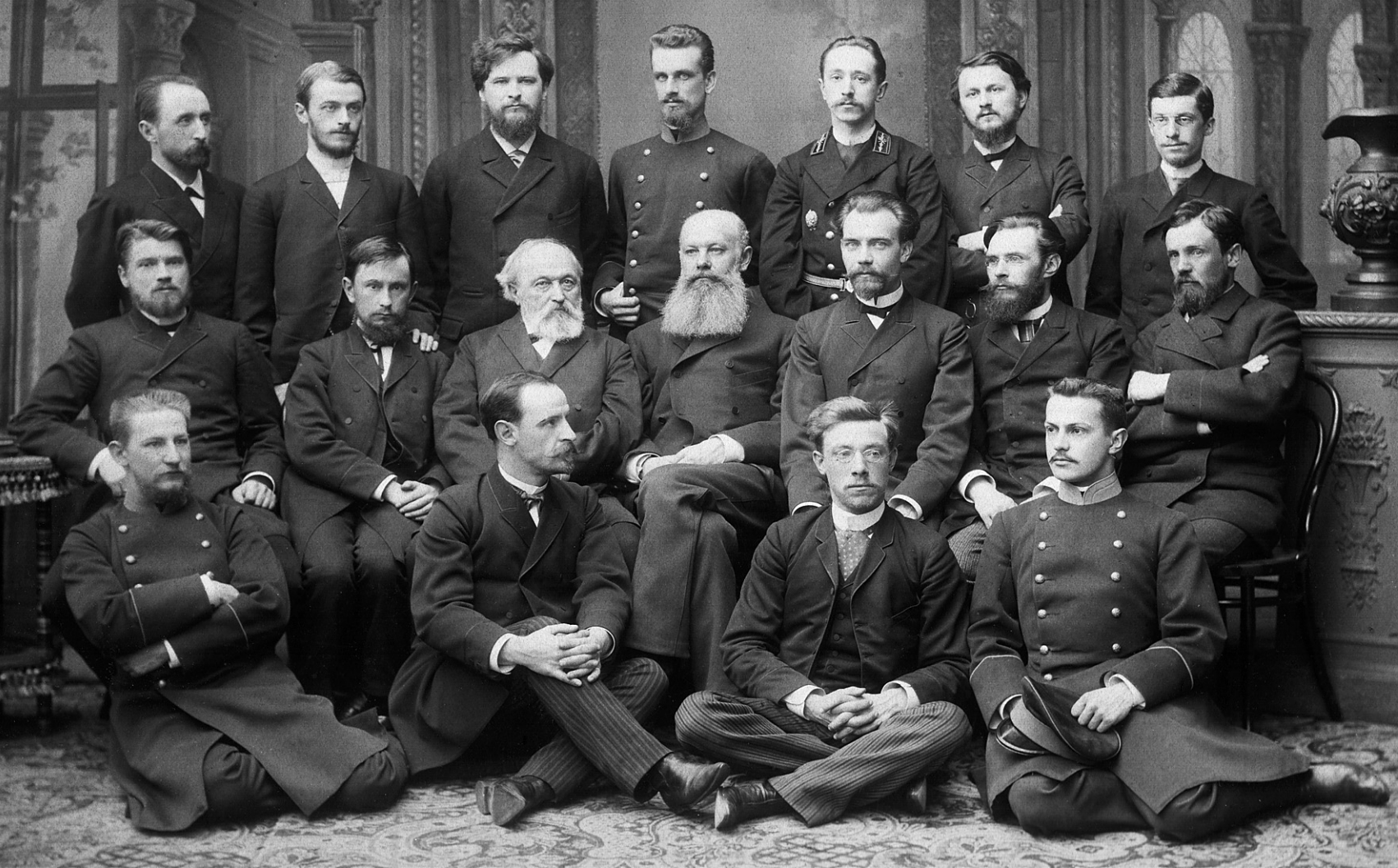
Vasily Dokuchaev and Alexander Sovetov with students

- Aleksandr Dokuchayev
- History of soil science
- List of Russian Earth scientists
- List of prizes known as the Nobel of a field

== Bibliography ==
- Berg, L. S. 1937. V.V. Dokuchaev as a Geographer. Pochvovedenie No. 2. (in Russian)
- Boulaine, J. 1984. Le Countrepoint et le Cortege de Dokuchaev: Quelques Contemporains du Fondateur de la Pedologie Genetique. Pedologie 34: 5-22.
- Cheborareva, L. A. 1961. Vasilii Vasilevich Dokuchaev (1846-1903): A Biographical Sketch. In V.V. Dokuchaev. Sochineniya. Izd-vo AN SSSR, Moscow. (in Russian)
- Dimo, N.A. 1946. V. V. Dokuchaev - Organizer of Higher Schools. Pochvovedenie No. 6. (in Russian)
- Dobrovol'ski, G. V. 1983. The Role of V.V. Dokuchaev's "Russian Chernozem" in the Formation and Development of Soil Science. Moscow State University Soil Science Bulletin 38: 3–8.
- Egorov, V. V. 1979. Reflection and Development of Some Ideas of V.V. Dokuchaev in Modern Soil Science. Vestnik MGU, ser. 17, Pochvovedenie, No. 2. (in Russian)
- Esakov V. A. Dokuchaiev Vasily Vasilievich // Dictionary of scientific biography. Vol. 4. N.Y.: Chsrles Scribner's Sons. 1971. P. 143–146.
- Gerasimov, I. P. 1946. V.V. Dokuchaev's Doctrine of Natural Zones. Pochvovedenie 6: 353–360.
- Glinka, K. D. 1927. Dokuchaiev's Ideas in the Development of Pedology and the Cognate Sciences. Russian Pedological Investigations No. 1, USSR Academy of Sciences, Leningrad.
- Glinka K. D. Dokuchaiev's ideas in the development of pedology and cognate sciences. Leningrad: Acad. Sci. USSR. 1927. 32 p. (Russian pedological investigations. Vol. 1.)
- Gregoryev, A. A., and I. P. Gerasimov (eds). 1946. V.V. Dokuchaev and Geography. Academy of Science, Moscow.
- Krupenikov, I. A., and L. A. Krupenikov. 1947. The Eminent Russian Scientist V.V. Dokuchaev, Father of Modern Soil Science. Sofia (in Czech)
- Krupenikov, I. A., and L. A. Krupenikov. 1948. Vasilii Vasilevich Dokuchaev. Molodaya Gvardiya, Moscow. (in Russian)
- Margulіs H. Aux sources de la pédologie (Dokoutchaïev-Sibirtzev). Toulouse, 1954. 85 p. (Ann. École nationale supérieure agronomique. T. 2).
- Moon, David (December 2005). "The Environmental History of the Russian Steppes: Vasilii Dokuchaev and the Harvest Failure of 1891" (PDF). Transactions of the Royal Historical Society. 15: 149–174. doi:10.1017/S0080440105000320. ISSN 0080-4401. S2CID 233362278.
- Ototskii, P. V. 1903. Life of V. V. Dokuchaev. Pochvovedenie, No. 4. (in Russian)
- Polynov, B. B., I. A. Krupenikov, and L.A. Krupenikov. 1956. Vasilii Vasil'evich Dokuchaev: Notes on His Life and Work. Izd-vo AN SSSR, Moscow-Leningrad. (in Russian)
- Prasolov, L. I. 1946. Dokuchaev - His Life and Work. Pochvovedenie, No. 6. (in Russian)
- Prasolov, L. I. 1947. V.V. Dokuchaev - The Founder of Contemporary Scientific Pedology. Pochvovedenie No. 2: 73–81.
- Simonson, R. W. 1997b. Early Teaching in USA of Dokuchaiev Factors of Soil Formation. Soil Science Society of America Journal 61(1): 11–16.
- Sobolev, S. S. 1949. Main Landmarks in the Creativity of V.V. Dokuchaev. In Dokuchaev, V.V. Izbr. Trudy. Izd-vo AN SSSR, Moscow. (in Russian)
- Sokolov, A. V. 1946. The Role of the Plant in the Soil Doctrine of V. Dokuchaev. Pochvovedenie No 6: 366–373.
- Vilenski, D. G. 1946. The Role and Importance of Dokuchaev in Soil Science. Pochvovedenie No. 6: 343–352.
- Yakovleva, L. A. 1958. Problem of Philosophical Evaluation of Some Aspects of V.V. Dokuchaev's Ideas About Soil. Vopr. Filosofii, No. 9. (in Russian)
- Yarilov, A. A. 1946. Dokuchaev and His Doctrine. Pochvovedenie No. 6: 374–376.
- Yarilov, A. A. 1946. V.V. Dokuchaev and C.R. Marbut. Pochvovedenie, No. 1. (in Russian)
- Zakharov, S. A. 1939. Last Years of V.V. Dokuchaev's Activity. Pochvovedenie, No. 1. (in Russian)
- Zakharov, S. A. 1946. Dokuchaev as the Founder and Organizer of the New Science of Genetic Soil Science. Pochvovekenie No. 6: 361–365.
- Zavalishin, A. A. 1958. Dokuchaev's Doctrine of Soil Forming Factors as a Basis of the Comparative Geographical Method of Soil Investigation. Pochvovedenie No. 9: 39–47.
- Zavaritskii, V. N. 1953. The Scientific-Organizational and Social Activity of V.V. Dokuchaev. In V.V. Dokuchaev, Sochineniya. Izd-vo AN SSSR, Moscow, Vol. VIII. (in Russian)
- Zonn, S. V. 1979. Dokuchaev and Contemporary Issues in Soil Science. Pochvovedenie, No. 9. (in Russian)
