= List of Russian earth scientists =

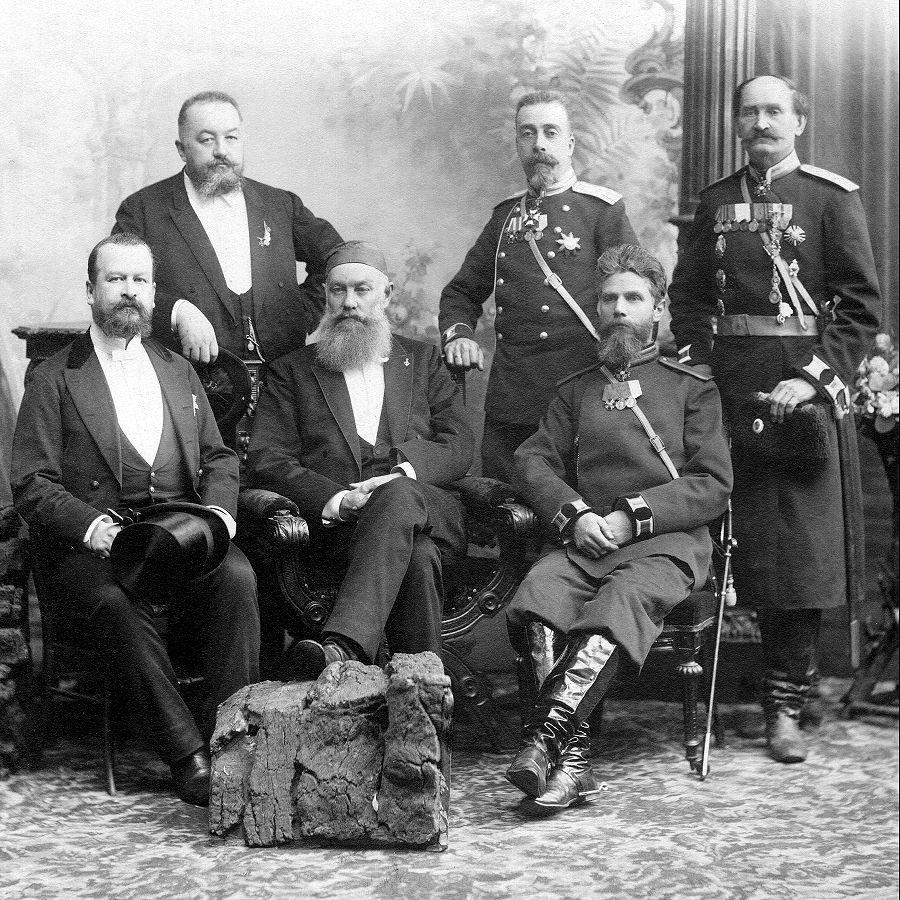
Vasily Dokuchaev, the founder of soil science

This list of Russian Earth scientists includes the notable geographers, geologists, oceanographers, meteorologists, ecologists and other representatives of Earth sciences from the Russian Federation, the Soviet Union, the Russian Empire and other predecessor states of Russia.

== Alphabetical list ==
=== A ===
- Vladimir Abazarov, geologist, discoverer of Samotlor oil field, the largest Russian oil field
- Maukhida Abdulkabirova, geologist and metallurgist
- Dmitry Anuchin, anthropologist and geographer, coined the term "anthroposphere", determined the location of the Volga river source
- Andrey Arkhangelsky, geologist

=== B ===
- Karl Baer, naturalist, formulated the geological Baer's law on river erosion, co-founder of the Russian Geographical Society
- Valeri Barsukov, geologist
- Vladimir Belousov, geologist
- Lev Berg, determined the depth of Central Asian lakes, including Balkhash Lake and Issyk Kul, a head of the Soviet Geographical Society
- Yuri Bilibin, geologist, studied placer geology and organized expeditions that discovered gold deposits in Eastern Siberia
- Mariya Borodayevskaya, geologist
- Leonid Brekhovskikh, founder of modern acoustical oceanography, discovered the deep sound channel, the first to observe mesoscale ocean eddies

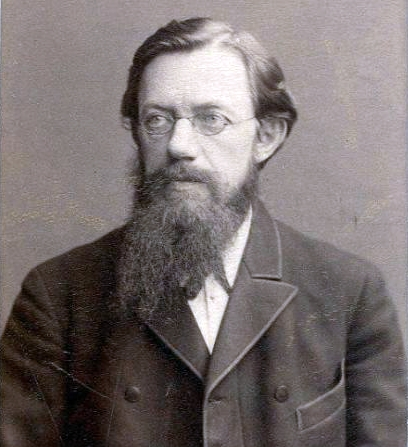
Chersky

=== C ===
- Feodosy Chernyshov, geologist
- Ivan Chersky, paleontologist, geologist and explorer of Siberia, explained the origin of Lake Baikal, pioneered the geomorphological evolution theory
- Pyotr Chikhachyov, early geographer and geologist of Central Asia, discovered Kuznetsk Coal Basin

=== D ===
- Vasily Dokuchaev, founder of soil science, created the first soil classification, determined the five factors for soil formation

=== E ===
- Raul–Yuri Ervier, geologist, organizer and head of wide-ranging geological explorations that discovered of the largest oil and gas fields in Western Siberia

=== F ===
- Alexander Fersman, a founder of geochemistry, discovered copper in Monchegorsk, apatites in Khibiny, sulfur in Central Asia

=== G ===
- Grigory Gamburtsev, Soviet seismologist, invented a number of seismological methods and devices
- Boris Golitsyn, inventor of electromagnetic seismograph, the president of International Association of Seismology
- Innokenti Gerasimov, geographer and soil scientist.
- Maria Glazovskaya, soil scientist and agrochemist.
- Konstantin Glinka, influential Russian soil scientist.
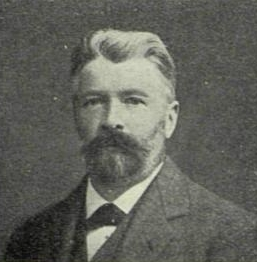
  Konstantin Glinka
- Andrey Grigoryev, geographer and geomorphologist, founder of the Institute of Geography of the Russian Academy of Sciences
- Ivan Gubkin, founder of the Gubkin Russian State University of Oil and Gas

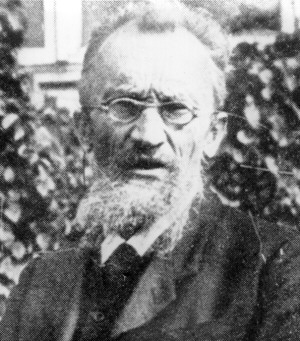
Köppen

=== K ===
- Stanislav Kalesnik, geographer
- Alexander Karpinsky, geologist and mineralogist, the first President of the Soviet Academy of Sciences
- Alexander Keyserling, naturalist, a founder of Russian geology
- Maria Klenova, a founder of marine geology, polar explorer
- Wladimir Köppen, meteorologist and author of the commonly used Köppen climate classification
- Nikolai Korzhenevskiy, geographer
- Stepan Krasheninnikov, geographer, the first Russian naturalist, made the first scientific description of Kamchatka
- Peter Kropotkin, geographer
- Alexander Kruber, founder of Russian karstology
- Nikolai Kudryavtsev, author of modern abiogenic theory for origin of petroleum, coordinated oil and gas exploration in Siberia
- Leonid Kulik, meteorite researcher, the first to study Tunguska event

=== L ===
- Dmitry Lachinov, meteorologist
- Vladimir N. Larin, geologist, whose "Primordially Hydridic Earth" theory suggested that natural hydrogen played a vital role in the evolution of Earth
- Irina Levshakova, paleontologist and geologist
- Mikhail Lomonosov, polymath, suggested the organic origin of soil, peat, coal, petroleum and amber; forerunner of the continental drift theory, pioneer researcher of atmospheric electricity

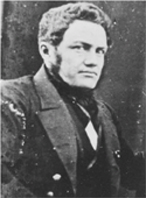
Middendorf

=== M ===
- Stepan Makarov, oceanographer
- Konstantin K. Markov, geomorphologist
- Alexander Middendorf, zoologist and explorer, founder of permafrost science, determined the southern border of permafrost
- Pavel Molchanov, meteorologist inventor of radiosonde
- Andrei Monin, meteorologist
- Dmitrii Mushketov, geologist
- Ivan Mushketov, made the first geological map of Turkestan

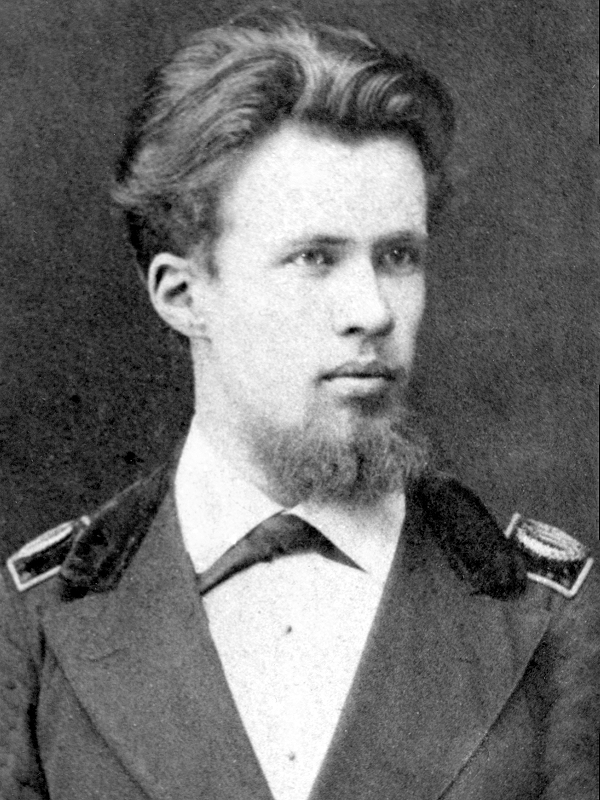
Obruchev

=== O ===
- Vladimir Obruchev, geologist and explorer, author of the comprehensive Geology of Siberia and two popular science fiction novels, Plutonia and Sannikov Land
- Alexander Obukhov, meteorologist

=== P ===
- Fyodor Panayev, meteorologist
- Vasiliy Podshibyakin, geologist, discoverer of Urengoy gas field
- Pavel Polian, geographer
- Mikhail Pomortsev, meteorologist, inventor of the nephoscope
- Aleksandr Popov, permafrost researcher
- Vladimir Porfiriev, geologist

=== R ===
- Voin Rimsky-Korsakov, geographer
- Vladimir Rusanov, geologist
- Vasiliy E. Ruzhentsev, geologist

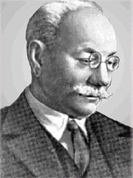
Shokalsky

=== S ===
- Farman Salmanov, discoverer of giant oil fields in West Siberia
- Pyotr Semyonov-Tyan-Shansky, explorer of the Tian Shan Mountains, for 40 years the head of the Russian Geographical Society, prominent statistician and organiser of the first Russian Empire Census
- Nikolay Shatsky, made a comprehensive tectonic map of North Eurasia, introduced Riphean and Baikalian geological stages
- Pyotr Shirshov, polar explorer, founder of the Shirshov Institute of Oceanology, proved that there is life in high latitudes of the Arctic Ocean
- Yuly Shokalsky, first head of the Soviet Geographical Society, coined the term "World Ocean"
- Sergey Smirnov, geologist
- Boris Sokolov, geologist
- Elizabeth Soshkina, geologist, biologist, palaeontologist
- Kozma Spassky-Avtonomov, meteorologist

=== T ===
- Mikhail Tetyaev, geologist
- Andrey Tikhonov, mathematician and inventor of magnetotellurics in geology
- Aleksey Tillo, made the first correct hypsometric map of European Russia, coined the term "Central Russian Upland", measured the lengths of the main Russian rivers

=== U ===
- Nikolay Urvantsev, geologist
- Mikhail Usov, geologist
- Tatyana Ustinova, geographer

=== V ===
- Nikolai Vavilov, geographer
- Vladimir Vernadsky, philosopher and geologist, a founder of geochemistry, biogeochemistry and radiogeology, creator of noosphere theory, popularized the term "biosphere" and developed biosphere theory

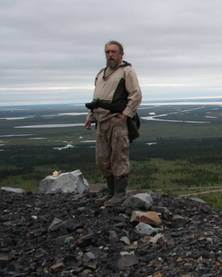
Zimov

=== Z ===
- Sergey Zimov, geophysicist specialising in arctic and subarctic ecology, known for advocating the theory that human overhunting of large herbivores during the Pleistocene caused Siberia's grassland-steppe ecosystem to disappear, for raising awareness of the roles permafrost and thermokarst lakes play in the global carbon cycle, and for creating Pleistocene Park
- Yevdokim Zyablovskiy, geographer

== See also ==
- Bibliography of science and technology in Russia and the Soviet Union
- List of geographers
- List of geologists
- List of meteorologists
- List of Russian physicians and psychologists
- List of Russian explorers
- List of Russian biologists
- List of Russian scientists
- Science and technology in Russia
