= Bạch Hổ oil field =

Offshore oil field in Vietnam

Bạch Hổ oil field White Tiger
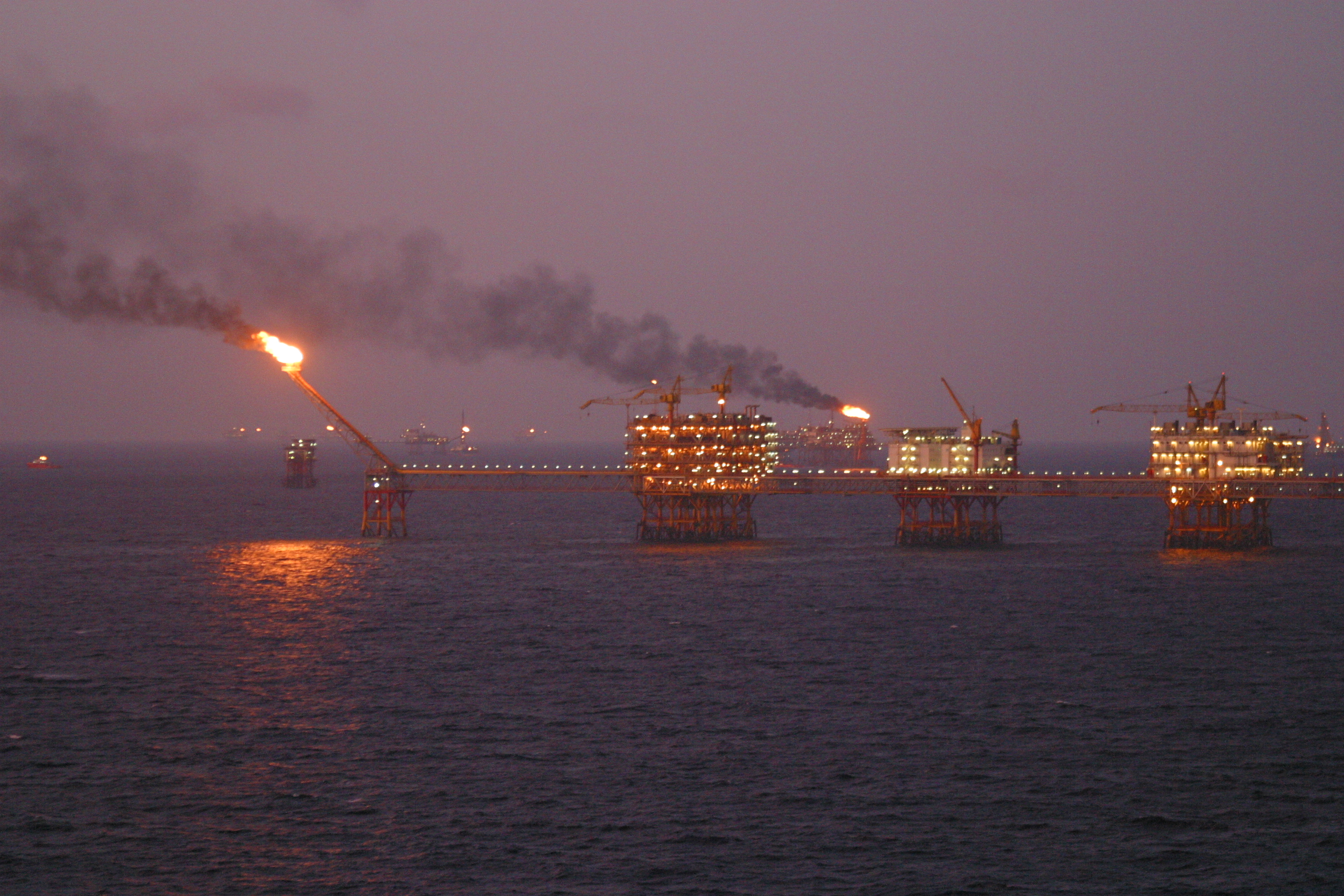
- An oil rig offshore Vungtau in Bạch Hổ field.
- Country: Vietnam
- Region: East Sea
- Location: Cuu Long basin
- Offshore/onshore: Offshore
- Operators: Vietsovpetro

Field history
- Discovery: 1975

The Bạch Hổ oil field (White Tiger oilfield) is a major oil field in the Cuu Long basin of the East Sea located offshore due east of the Mekong Delta of Vietnam. The field contains major reserves hosted within highly fractured granitic basement rocks. The Cuu Long basin is a rift zone developed during the Oligocene to Early Miocene. The rift occurred in Jurassic to Late Cretaceous granite to granodiorite intrusions. The fractured granitic rocks occur as a horst overlain and surrounded by Upper Oligocene lacustrine shale source rocks.

Bạch Hổ is not the only oil field convincingly shown to be hosted in granite; however, inspection of the seismic profile of the area shows faulted basement passive margin which is sealed by an onlapping sedimentary sequence.

It is plausible that the oil has migrated laterally from the lowermost, mature sediments into the fault systems within the granite. The seismic profile shows a definite basement horst with onlapping sedimentary source rocks, draped by a reservoir seal. This trap view would see the oil migrate up the horst bounding faults from the lower source units, into the trap unit draped over the top.

Mobil struck oil in the Bạch Hổ field in February 1975, shortly before the Fall of Saigon. It was later developed by the joint Vietnamese-Russian entity Vietsovpetro in the 1980s and 1990s. Upon examination of the source rock and oil content, petrogeologists have emphasized that the oil's components indicate a lacustrine organic facies with lipid-rich, land-plant debris and fresh-water algal material, refuting theories of abiogenic origin in this area.

== Depiction on banknote ==
The White Tiger oilfield is depicted on the reverse of the 10,000 VND banknote, issued in the 2003 Polymer series by the State Bank of Vietnam.

== See also ==
- Abiogenic petroleum origin
- Nikolai Kudryavtsev
