= Emmanuil B. Chekaliuk =

Emmanuïl Bogdanovych Chekaliuk (Ukrainian: Емануїл Богданович Чекалюк Gnizdychev, Zhydachiv District, Lviv Oblast, May 6, 1909 – Lviv, January 5, 1990) was a Ukrainian petroleum engineer and statistical thermodynamicist. He first produced rigorous physical and mathematical evidences of petroleum thermodynamic stability at mantlean conditions. Since the 1990s the heavy hydrocarbons mixture enriched with organometallic compounds is widely known as "Chekaliuk’s petroleum".

Born in the family of a parson he graduated from Electromechanics Faculty at Lviv Polytech Institute in 1933 and then worked as an electrician at Kalush potash plant and later received the job of an engineer at the factory for domestic electric appliances in Warsaw. His first research paper on electrophysics was published in Przeglad electrotechniczny Jour. in 1938. After WW II he come back to Ukraine and linked his career with petroleum industry and passed through all positions from a field engineer to a director of large production enterprise. In 1951 Chekaliuk started to work at Central Research Lab of Ukrnafta Co. in Boryslav, and in 1955 he joined Ukrainian Research Geoexploration Institute (UkrDGRI). Defended his PhD thesis entitled "Non-stationary phenomena of homogeneous liquid inflow from porous medium" at Lviv Polytech Inst. in 1957. A Dr.Sc. dissertation in Engineering "Some thermodynamic phenomena in porous medium and the ways of their application to petroleum industry" was defended in Moscow at All-Union Research Institute for Petroleum (VNIGNI) in 1962. He studied different aspects of reservoir properties, filtration of liquids and gases, physical parameters of deep oils, pay zone testing, production well-logging, oil field development, enhanced oil recovery, thermodynamics of hydrocarbon deposits, liquidation of accidental gas gushers.

Since 1964 he worked for Inst. of Geology and Geochemistry of Combustible Minerals, Nat’l Ac. Sci. Ukraine, in Lviv where he headed the Abyssal Hydrocarbons Dept. and coined new scientific trend of petroleum geology, geo-thermodynamics. With his colleagues he developed a principally new technology of enhanced oil recovery from the deep pools (to 3000 m depth) using the water with higher thermodynamic parameters. He has determined the optimal depth to preserve mantlean hydrocarbons and calculated their chemical composition and with his teammates conducted first experiments on high temperature synthesis of hydrocarbon systems in hydrocarbonate medium. Also he studied the problem of hydrocarbon systems kinetic transformation at sedimentary cover conditions. Besides, he interested in theoretical physics and published a fundamental monograph "Gnoseological potential of classical mechanics (to 300th anniversary of Isaac Newton research career)" and several articles on the topic.

He generated more than 170 research publications, including 9 monographs and received 14 inventor's certificates related to hydrocarbon fields development and enhanced oil recovery. His technology applying the special water solution for oil recovery was patented in the UK, Canada, and Mexico.

Soviet authorities did not value Chekaliuk's work because his own brother was a soldier of Ukrainian Insurgent Army (UPA) and sentenced to 25 years of imprisonment. Therefore, Chekaliuk had no chance to become a Member of UkrSSR Academy of Sciences, to head the institute or even to travel abroad.

== Selected publications ==
- Chekaliuk E.B, 1961. Basics of oil and gas pools piezometry. - Kiev, GosTechIzdat. - 268 p. (in Russian)
- Chekaliuk E.B., 1965. Thermodynamics of oil pay zone. – Moscow, Nedra Press. - 240 p. (in Russian)
- Chekaliuk E.B., 1966. Petroleum in the Earth's upper mantle. In: Problem of oil gas origin and formation of their commercial accumulations. - Kiev, Naukova Dumka Publ. - p. 49-62 (in Russian)
- Chekaliuk E.B., 1967. Petroleum in the Earth's upper mantle. – Kiev, Naukova Dumka Publ. - 256 p. (in Russian)
- Chekaliuk, E.B., 1971. The thermodynamic basis for the theory of the abiotic genesis of petroleum. – Kiev, Naukova Dumka Publ. – 256 p. (in Russian)
- Chekaliuk, E.B., Fedortsov I.M., Ossadchy V.G., 1974. Field geothermal surveying. - Kiev, Naukova Dumka Publ. - 103 p. (in Russian)
- Chekaliuk E.B., 1975. Thermodynamic properties of hydrocarbon systems. In: Problems of Endogenous petroleum geology and geochemistry. – Kiev, Naukova Dumka Publ. - pp. 30–39 (in Russian)
- Chekaliuk E.B., 1971. Petroleum-producing layer of the Earth's upper mantle. In: Genesis of oil and gas and formation of their commercial accumulations. – Kiev, Naukova Dumka Publ. - pp. 37–51 (in Russian)
- Chekaliuk E.B., 1976. The thermal stability of hydrocarbon systems in geothermodynamic systems. In: Earth's Outgassing and Geotectonics [Degazatsiia Zemli i Geotektonika], P.N.Kropotkin, Ed. - pp. 267–272 (in Russian)
- Chekaliuk E.B., 1975. Energetic processes in the interior part of the Earth and their role in the formation of oil fields. In: Regularities of formation and distribution of commercial oil and gas fields. - Kiev, Naukova Dumka Publ. - p. 66-76. (in Russian)
- Chekaliuk E.B. and Filyas Yu.I.,1977. Water-oil solutions. – Kiev, Naukova Dumka Publ. – 128 p. (in Russian)
- Chekaliuk E.B., 1978. Gnoseological potential of classical mechanics (to 300th anniversary of Isaac Newton research career). - Lviv. Dep. in VINITI, October 3, 1978. - 248 p. (in Russian)
- Chekaliuk E.B. and Oganov V.A., 1979. Thermal methods to improve oil recovery. – Kiev, Naukova Dumka Publ. – 208 p. (in Russian)
- Chekaliuk E.B. and Boyko G.E., 1982. Geo-thermodynamic evidences for abyssal genesis of oil. In: Peculiarities of the Earth's crust abyssal structure and theoretical provisions of inorganic origin of petroleum. – Kiev, Naukova Dumka Publ. - pp. 185–210 (in Russian)
- Chekaliuk E.B., 1986. Towards the problem of oil synthesis at great depths. Mendeleev All-Union Chem. Soc. Jour. – Moscow, [Khimiya] Chemistry, vol. XXXI (5). – pp. 556–562 (in Russian)
- Chekaliuk, E.B., 1990. Thermodynamic fundamental of experimental chemical kinetics. – Lviv, Institute for Geology and Geochem. of Combustible Minerals. – 32 p. (in Russian)
- Chekaliuk, E.B. and Kenney J.F., 1991. The stability of hydrocarbons in the thermodynamic conditions of the Earth. Proc. Am. Phys. Soc., vol. 36(3): 347.
- Filyus R.I., 1979. Emmanuil Bogdanovych Chekaliuk (Bibliography). - Lviv. - 19 p. (in Russian)

== See also ==
- Abiogenic petroleum origin
- Lviv Polytechnic National University
- Institute of Geology and Geochemistry of Combustible Minerals, NASU, Lviv
