= Abiogenic petroleum origin =

Fringe theory about the origin of petroleum

The abiogenic petroleum origin hypothesis proposes that most of Earth's petroleum and natural gas deposits were formed inorganically, commonly known as abiotic oil. Scientific evidence overwhelmingly supports a biogenic origin for most of the world's petroleum deposits. Mainstream theories about the formation of hydrocarbons on Earth point to an origin from the decomposition of long-dead organisms, though the existence of hydrocarbons on extraterrestrial bodies like Saturn's moon Titan indicates that hydrocarbons are sometimes naturally produced by non-biological means. A historical overview of theories of the abiogenic origins of hydrocarbons has been published.

Thomas Gold's "deep gas hypothesis" proposes that some natural gas deposits were formed out of hydrocarbons deep in the Earth's mantle. Earlier studies of mantle-derived rocks from many places have shown that hydrocarbons from the mantle region can be found widely around the globe. However, the concentration of such hydrocarbons is low. While there may be large deposits of abiotic hydrocarbons, globally significant amounts of abiotic hydrocarbons are deemed unlikely.

== Overview hypotheses ==
Some abiogenic hypotheses have proposed that oil and gas did not originate from fossil deposits, but have instead originated from deep carbon deposits, present since the formation of the Earth.

The abiogenic hypothesis regained some support in 2009 when researchers at the KTH Royal Institute of Technology in Stockholm reported they believed they had proven that fossils from animals and plants are not necessary for crude oil and natural gas to be generated.

== History ==
An abiogenic hypothesis was first proposed by Georgius Agricola in the 16th century and various additional abiogenic hypotheses were proposed in the 19th century, most notably by Prussian geographer Alexander von Humboldt (1804), the Russian chemist Dmitri Mendeleev (1877) and the French chemist Marcellin Berthelot. Abiogenic hypotheses were revived in the last half of the 20th century by Soviet scientists who had little influence outside the Soviet Union because most of their research was published in Russian. The hypothesis was re-defined and made popular in the West by astronomer Thomas Gold, a prominent proponent of the abiogenic hypothesis, who developed his theories from 1979 to 1998 and published his research in English.

Abraham Gottlob Werner and the proponents of neptunism in the 18th century regarded basaltic sills as solidified oils or bitumen. While these notions proved unfounded, the basic idea of an association between petroleum and magmatism persisted. Von Humboldt proposed an inorganic abiogenic hypothesis for petroleum formation after he observed petroleum springs in the Bay of Cumaux (Cumaná) on the northeast coast of Venezuela. He is quoted as saying, "the petroleum is the product of a distillation from great depth and issues from the primitive rocks beneath which the forces of all volcanic action lie". Other early prominent proponents of what would become the generalized abiogenic hypothesis included Dmitri Mendeleev and Berthelot.

In 1951, the Soviet geologist Nikolai Alexandrovitch Kudryavtsev proposed the modern abiotic hypothesis of petroleum. On the basis of his analysis of the Athabasca Oil Sands in Alberta, Canada, he concluded that no "source rocks" could form the enormous volume of hydrocarbons, and therefore offered abiotic deep petroleum as the most plausible explanation. (Humic coals have since been proposed for the source rocks.) Others who continued Kudryavtsev's work included Petr N. Kropotkin, Vladimir B. Porfir'ev, Emmanuil B. Chekaliuk, Vladilen A. Krayushkin, Georgi E. Boyko, Georgi I. Voitov, Grygori N. Dolenko, Iona V. Greenberg, Nikolai S. Beskrovny, and Victor F. Linetsky.

Following Thomas Gold's death in 2004, Jack Kenney of Gas Resources Corporation has recently come into prominence as a proponent of the theories, supported by studies by researchers at the Royal Institute of Technology (KTH) in Stockholm, Sweden.

== Foundations of abiogenic hypotheses ==
Within the mantle, carbon may exist as hydrocarbons—chiefly methane—and as elemental carbon, carbon dioxide, and carbonates. The abiotic hypothesis posits that the full suite of hydrocarbons found in petroleum can be generated either in the mantle by abiogenic processes, or by biological processing of those abiogenic hydrocarbons, and that the source-hydrocarbons of abiogenic origin can migrate out of the mantle into the crust until they escape to the surface or are trapped by impermeable strata, forming petroleum reservoirs.

Abiogenic hypotheses generally reject the supposition that certain molecules found within petroleum, known as biomarkers, are indicative of the biological origin of petroleum. They contend that these molecules mostly come from microbes feeding on petroleum in its upward migration through the crust, that some of them are found in meteorites, which have presumably never contacted living material, and that some can be generated abiogenically by plausible reactions in petroleum.

Some of the evidence used to support abiogenic theories includes:

| Proponents | Item |
|---|---|
| Gold | The presence of methane on other planets, meteors, moons and comets |
| Gold, Kenney | Proposed mechanisms of abiotically chemically synthesizing hydrocarbons within the mantle |
| Kudryavtsev, Gold | Hydrocarbon-rich areas tend to be hydrocarbon-rich at many different levels |
| Kudryavtsev, Gold | Petroleum and methane deposits are found in large patterns related to deep-seated large-scale structural features of the crust rather than to the patchwork of sedimentary deposits |
| Gold | Interpretations of the chemical and isotopic composition of natural petroleum |
| Kudryavtsev, Gold | The presence of oil and methane within non-sedimentary rocks upon the Earth |
| Gold | The existence of methane hydrate deposits |
| Gold | Perceived ambiguity in some assumptions and key evidence used in the conventional understanding of petroleum origin. |
| Gold | Bituminous coal creation is based upon deep hydrocarbon seeps |
| Gold | Surface carbon budget and oxygen levels stable over geologic time scales |
| Kudryavtsev, Gold | The biogenic explanation does not explain some hydrocarbon deposit characteristics |
| Szatmari | The distribution of metals in crude oils fits better with upper serpentinized mantle, primitive mantle and chondrite patterns than oceanic and continental crust, and show no correlation with sea water |
| Gold | The association of hydrocarbons with helium, a noble gas |

== Recent investigation of abiogenic hypotheses ==
As of 2009, little research is directed towards establishing abiogenic petroleum or methane, although the Carnegie Institution for Science has reported that ethane and heavier hydrocarbons can be synthesized under conditions of the upper mantle. Research mostly related to astrobiology and the deep microbial biosphere and serpentinite reactions, however, continues to provide insight into the contribution of abiogenic hydrocarbons into petroleum accumulations.

- Rock porosity and migration pathways for abiogenic petroleum.
- Mantle peridotite serpentinization reactions and other natural Fischer–Tropsch analogs.
- Primordial hydrocarbons in meteorites, comets, asteroids and the solid bodies of the Solar System.
  - Primordial or ancient sources of hydrocarbons or carbon in Earth.
    - Primordial hydrocarbons formed from hydrolysis of metal carbides of the iron peak of cosmic elemental abundance (chromium, iron, nickel, vanadium, manganese, cobalt).
- Isotopic studies of groundwater reservoirs, sedimentary cements, formation gases and the composition of the noble gases and nitrogen in many oil fields.

Common criticisms include:

- If oil was created in the mantle, it would be expected that oil would be most commonly found in fault zones, as that would provide the greatest opportunity for oil to migrate into the crust from the mantle. Additionally, the mantle near subduction zones tends to be more oxidizing than the rest. However, the locations of oil deposits have not been found to be correlated with fault zones, with some exceptions.

== Proposed mechanisms of abiogenic petroleum ==
=== Primordial deposits ===
Thomas Gold's work was focused on hydrocarbon deposits of primordial origin. Meteorites are believed to represent the major composition of material from which the Earth was formed. Some meteorites, such as carbonaceous chondrites, contain carbonaceous material. If a large amount of this material is still within the Earth, it could have been leaking upward for billions of years. The thermodynamic conditions within the mantle would allow many hydrocarbon molecules to be at equilibrium under high pressure and high temperature. Although molecules in these conditions may disassociate, resulting fragments would be reformed due to the pressure. An average equilibrium of various molecules would exist depending upon conditions and the carbon-hydrogen ratio of the material.

=== Creation within the mantle ===
Russian researchers concluded that hydrocarbon mixes would be created within the mantle. Experiments under high temperatures and pressures produced many hydrocarbons—including n-alkanes through C_{10}H_{22}—from iron oxide, calcium carbonate, and water. Because such materials are in the mantle and in subducted crust, there is no requirement that all hydrocarbons be produced from primordial deposits.

=== Hydrogen generation ===
Hydrogen gas and water have been found more than 6,000 metres (20,000 ft) deep in the upper crust in the Siljan Ring boreholes and the Kola Superdeep Borehole. Data from the western United States suggests that aquifers from near the surface may extend to depths of 10,000 metres (33,000 ft) to 20,000 metres (66,000 ft). Hydrogen gas can be created by water reacting with silicates, quartz, and feldspar at temperatures in the range of 25 °C (77 °F) to 270 °C (518 °F). These minerals are common in crustal rocks such as granite. Hydrogen may react with dissolved carbon compounds in water to form methane and higher carbon compounds.

One reaction not involving silicates, but only iron(II) oxide, which can produce hydrogen is:

Ferrous oxide + water → magnetite + hydrogen
3 FeO + H_{2}O → Fe_{3}O_{4} + H_{2}

This redox reaction closely resembles the Schikorr reaction involving the partial oxidation and conversion of iron(II) hydroxide (green rust) in magnetite, hydrogen and water:

Ferrous hydroxide → magnetite + hydrogen + water
3 Fe(OH)_{2} → Fe_{3}O_{4} + H_{2} + 2 H_{2}O

The above reaction operates best at low pressures. At pressures greater than 5 gigapascals (49,000 atm), almost no hydrogen is formed.

Thomas Gold reported that hydrocarbons were found in the Siljan Ring borehole and in general increased with depth, although the venture was not a commercial success.

However, several geologists analysed the results and said that no hydrocarbon was found.

=== Serpentinite mechanism ===
In 1967, the Soviet scientist Emmanuil B. Chekaliuk proposed that petroleum could be formed at high temperatures and pressures from inorganic carbon in the form of carbon dioxide, hydrogen or methane.

This mechanism is supported by several lines of evidence which are accepted by modern scientific literature. This involves synthesis of oil within the crust via catalysis by chemically reductive rocks. A proposed mechanism for the formation of inorganic hydrocarbons is via natural analogs of the Fischer–Tropsch process known as the serpentinite mechanism or the serpentinite process.

CH_{4} + ½ O_{2} → 2 H_{2} + CO
(2n+1) H_{2} + nCO → C_{n}H_{(2n+2)} + n H_{2}O

Serpentinites are ideal rocks to host this process as they are formed from peridotites and dunites, rocks which contain greater than 80% olivine and usually a percentage of Fe-Ti spinel minerals. Most olivines also contain high nickel concentrations (up to several percent) and may also contain chromite or chromium as a contaminant in olivine, providing the needed transition metals.

However, serpentinite synthesis and spinel cracking reactions require hydrothermal alteration of pristine peridotite-dunite, which is a finite process intrinsically related to metamorphism, and further, requires significant addition of water. Serpentinite is unstable at mantle temperatures and is readily dehydrated to granulite, amphibolite, talc–schist and even eclogite. This suggests that methanogenesis in the presence of serpentinites is restricted in space and time to mid-ocean ridges and upper levels of subduction zones. However, water has been found as deep as 12,000 metres (39,000 ft), so water-based reactions are dependent upon the local conditions. Oil being created by this process in intracratonic regions is limited by the materials and temperature.

==== Serpentinite synthesis ====
A chemical basis for the abiotic petroleum process is the serpentinization of peridotite, beginning with methanogenesis via hydrolysis of olivine into serpentine in the presence of carbon dioxide. Olivine, composed of Forsterite and Fayalite metamorphoses into serpentine, magnetite and silica by the following reactions, with silica from fayalite decomposition (reaction 1a) feeding into the forsterite reaction (1b).

Reaction 1a:
Fayalite + water → magnetite + aqueous silica + hydrogen

3 Fe_{2}SiO_{4} + 2 H_{2}O → 2 Fe_{3}O_{4} + 3 SiO_{2} + 2 H_{2}

Reaction 1b:
Forsterite + aqueous silica → serpentinite

3 Mg_{2}SiO_{4} + SiO_{2} + 4 H_{2}O → 2 Mg_{3}Si_{2}O_{5}(OH)_{4}

When this reaction occurs in the presence of dissolved carbon dioxide (carbonic acid) at temperatures above 500 °C (932 °F) Reaction 2a takes place.

Reaction 2a:
Olivine + water + carbonic acid → serpentine + magnetite + methane

(Fe,Mg)_{2}SiO_{4} + nH_{2}O + CO_{2} → Mg_{3}Si_{2}O_{5}(OH)_{4} + Fe_{3}O_{4} + CH_{4}

or, in balanced form:

18 Mg_{2}SiO_{4} + 6 Fe_{2}SiO_{4} + 26 H_{2}O + CO_{2} → 12 Mg_{3}Si_{2}O_{5}(OH)_{4} + 4 Fe_{3}O_{4} + CH_{4}

However, reaction 2(b) is just as likely, and supported by the presence of abundant talc-carbonate schists and magnesite stringer veins in many serpentinised peridotites;

Reaction 2b:
Olivine + water + carbonic acid → serpentine + magnetite + magnesite + silica

(Fe,Mg)_{2}SiO_{4} + n H_{2}O + CO_{2} → Mg_{3}Si_{2}O_{5}(OH)_{4} + MgCO_{3} + SiO_{2}

The upgrading of methane to higher n-alkane hydrocarbons is via dehydrogenation of methane in the presence of catalyst transition metals (e.g. Fe, Ni). This can be termed spinel hydrolysis.

=== Spinel polymerization mechanism ===
Magnetite, chromite and ilmenite are Fe-spinel group minerals found in many rocks but rarely as a major component in non-ultramafic rocks. In these rocks, high concentrations of magmatic magnetite, chromite and ilmenite provide a reduced matrix which may allow abiotic cracking of methane to higher hydrocarbons during hydrothermal events.

Chemically reduced rocks are required to drive this reaction and high temperatures are required to allow methane to be polymerized to ethane. Note that reaction 1a, above, also creates magnetite.

Reaction 3:
Methane + magnetite → ethane + hematite

n CH_{4} + n Fe_{3}O_{4} + n H_{2}O → C_{2}H_{6} + Fe_{2}O_{3} + HCO^{−}_{3} + H^{+}

Reaction 3 results in n-alkane hydrocarbons, including linear saturated hydrocarbons, alcohols, aldehydes, ketones, aromatics, and cyclic compounds.

=== Carbonate decomposition ===
Calcium carbonate may decompose at around 500 °C (932 °F) through the following reaction:

Reaction 5:
Hydrogen + calcium carbonate → methane + calcium oxide + water

4 H_{2} + CaCO_{3} → CH_{4} + CaO + 2 H_{2}O

Note that CaO (lime) is not a mineral species found within natural rocks. Whilst this reaction is possible, it is not plausible.

=== Evidence of abiogenic mechanisms ===
- Theoretical calculations by J.F. Kenney using scaled particle theory (a statistical mechanical model) for a simplified perturbed hard-chain predict that methane compressed to 30,000 bars (3.0 GPa) or 40,000 bars (4.0 GPa) kbar at 1,000 °C (1,830 °F) (conditions in the mantle) is relatively unstable in relation to higher hydrocarbons. However, these calculations do not include methane pyrolysis yielding amorphous carbon and hydrogen, which is recognized as the prevalent reaction at high temperatures.
- Experiments in diamond anvil high pressure cells have resulted in partial conversion of methane and inorganic carbonates into light hydrocarbons.

== Biotic (microbial) hydrocarbons ==
The "deep biotic petroleum hypothesis", similar to the abiogenic petroleum origin hypothesis, holds that not all petroleum deposits within the Earth's rocks can be explained purely according to the orthodox view of petroleum geology. Thomas Gold used the term "the deep hot biosphere" to describe the microbes which live underground.

This hypothesis is different from biogenic oil in that the role of deep-dwelling microbes is a biological source for oil which is not of a sedimentary origin and is not sourced from surface carbon. Deep microbial life is only a contaminant of primordial hydrocarbons. Parts of microbes yield molecules as biomarkers.

Deep biotic oil is considered to be formed as a byproduct of the life cycle of deep microbes. Shallow biotic oil is considered to be formed as a byproduct of the life cycles of shallow microbes.

=== Microbial biomarkers ===
Thomas Gold, in a 1999 book, cited the discovery of thermophile bacteria in the Earth's crust as new support for the postulate that these bacteria could explain the existence of certain biomarkers in extracted petroleum. A rebuttal of biogenic origins based on biomarkers has been offered by Kenney, et al. (2001).

==== Isotopic evidence ====
Methane is ubiquitous in crustal fluid and gas. Research continues to attempt to characterise crustal sources of methane as biogenic or abiogenic using carbon isotope fractionation of observed gases (Lollar & Sherwood 2006). There are few clear examples of abiogenic methane-ethane-butane, as the same processes favor enrichment of light isotopes in all chemical reactions, whether organic or inorganic. δ^{13}C of methane overlaps that of inorganic carbonate and graphite in the crust, which are heavily depleted in ^{12}C, and attain this by isotopic fractionation during metamorphic reactions.

One argument for abiogenic oil cites the high carbon depletion of methane as stemming from the observed carbon isotope depletion with depth in the crust. However, diamonds, which are definitively of mantle origin, are not as depleted as methane, which implies that methane carbon isotope fractionation is not controlled by mantle values.

Commercially extractable concentrations of helium (greater than 0.3%) are present in natural gas from the Panhandle-Hugoton fields in the US, as well as from some Algerian and Russian gas fields.

Helium trapped within most petroleum occurrences, such as the occurrence in Texas, is of a distinctly crustal character with an Ra ratio of less than 0.0001 that of the atmosphere.

=== Biomarker chemicals ===
Certain chemicals found in naturally occurring petroleum contain chemical and structural similarities to compounds found within many living organisms. These include terpenoids, terpenes, pristane, phytane, cholestane, chlorins and porphyrins, which are large, chelating molecules in the same family as heme and chlorophyll. Materials which suggest certain biological processes include tetracyclic diterpane and oleanane.

The presence of these chemicals in crude oil is a result of the inclusion of biological material in the oil; these chemicals are released by kerogen during the production of hydrocarbon oils, as these are chemicals highly resistant to degradation and plausible chemical paths have been studied. Abiotic defenders state that biomarkers get into oil during its way up as it gets in touch with ancient fossils. However a more plausible explanation is that biomarkers are traces of biological molecules from bacteria (archaea) that feed on primordial hydrocarbons and die in that environment. For example, hopanoids are just parts of the bacterial cell wall present in oil as a contaminant.

=== Trace metals ===
Nickel (Ni), vanadium (V), lead (Pb), arsenic (As), cadmium (Cd), mercury (Hg) and others metals frequently occur in oils. Some heavy crude oils, such as Venezuelan heavy crude have up to 45% vanadium pentoxide content in their ash, high enough that it is a commercial source for vanadium. Abiotic supporters argue that these metals are common in Earth's mantle, but relatively high contents of nickel, vanadium, lead and arsenic can be usually found in almost all marine sediments.

Analysis of 22 trace elements in oils correlate significantly better with chondrite, serpentinized fertile mantle peridotite, and the primitive mantle than with oceanic or continental crust, and shows no correlation with seawater.

=== Reduced carbon ===
Sir Robert Robinson studied the chemical makeup of natural petroleum oils in great detail, and concluded that they were mostly far too hydrogen-rich to be a likely product of the decay of plant debris, assuming a dual origin for Earth hydrocarbons. However, several processes which generate hydrogen could supply kerogen hydrogenation which is compatible with the conventional explanation. Olefins, the unsaturated hydrocarbons, would have been expected to predominate by far in any material that was derived in that way. He also wrote: "Petroleum ... [seems to be] a primordial hydrocarbon mixture into which bio-products have been added."

This hypothesis was later demonstrated to have been a misunderstanding by Robinson, related to the fact that only short duration experiments were available to him. Olefins are thermally very unstable (which is why natural petroleum normally does not contain such compounds) and in laboratory experiments that last more than a few hours, the olefins are no longer present.

The presence of low-oxygen and hydroxyl-poor hydrocarbons in natural living media is supported by the presence of natural waxes (n=30+), oils (n=20+) and lipids in both plant matter and animal matter, for instance fats in phytoplankton, zooplankton and so on. These oils and waxes, however, occur in quantities too small to significantly affect the overall hydrogen/carbon ratio of biological materials. However, after the discovery of highly aliphatic biopolymers in algae, and that oil generating kerogen essentially represents concentrates of such materials, no theoretical problem exists anymore. Also, the millions of source rock samples that have been analyzed for petroleum yield by the petroleum industry have confirmed the large quantities of petroleum found in sedimentary basins.

== Empirical evidence ==
Occurrences of abiotic petroleum in commercial amounts in the oil wells in offshore Vietnam are sometimes cited, as well as in the Eugene Island block 330 oil field, and the Dnieper-Donets Basin. However, the origins of all these wells can also be explained with the biotic theory. Modern geologists think that commercially profitable deposits of abiotic petroleum could be found, but no current deposit has convincing evidence that it originated from abiotic sources.

The Soviet school of thought saw evidence of their hypothesis in the fact that some oil reservoirs exist in non-sedimentary rocks such as granite, metamorphic or porous volcanic rocks. However, opponents noted that non-sedimentary rocks served as reservoirs for biologically originated oil expelled from nearby sedimentary source rock through common migration or re-migration mechanisms.

The following observations have been commonly used to argue for the abiogenic hypothesis, however each observation of actual petroleum can also be fully explained by biotic origin:

=== Lost City hydrothermal vent field ===
The Lost City hydrothermal field was determined to have abiogenic hydrocarbon production. Proskurowski et al. wrote, "Radiocarbon evidence rules out seawater bicarbonate as the carbon source for FTT reactions, suggesting that a mantle-derived inorganic carbon source is leached from the host rocks. Our findings illustrate that the abiotic synthesis of hydrocarbons in nature may occur in the presence of ultramafic rocks, water, and moderate amounts of heat."

=== Siljan Ring crater ===
The Siljan Ring meteorite crater, Sweden, was proposed by Thomas Gold as the most likely place to test the hypothesis because it was one of the few places in the world where the granite basement was cracked sufficiently (by meteorite impact) to allow oil to seep up from the mantle; furthermore it is infilled with a relatively thin veneer of sediment, which was sufficient to trap any abiogenic oil, but was modelled as not having been subjected to the heat and pressure conditions (known as the "oil window") normally required to create biogenic oil. However, some geochemists concluded by geochemical analysis that the oil in the seeps came from the organic-rich Ordovician Tretaspis shale, where it was heated by the meteorite impact.

In 1986–1990, the Gravberg-1 borehole was drilled through the deepest rock in the Siljan Ring in which proponents had hoped to find hydrocarbon reservoirs. It stopped at the depth of 6,800 metres (22,300 ft) due to drilling problems, after private investors spent $40 million. Some eighty barrels of magnetite paste and hydrocarbon-bearing sludge were recovered from the well; Gold maintained that the hydrocarbons were chemically different from, and not derived from, those added to the borehole, but analyses showed that the hydrocarbons were derived from the diesel fuel-based drilling fluid used in the drilling. This well also sampled over 13,000 feet (4,000 m) of methane-bearing inclusions.

In 1991–1992, a second borehole, Stenberg-1, was drilled a few miles away to a depth of 6,500 metres (21,300 ft), finding similar results.

=== Bacterial mats ===
Direct observation of bacterial mats and fracture-fill carbonate and humin of bacterial origin in deep boreholes in Australia are also taken as evidence for the abiogenic origin of petroleum.

=== Examples of proposed abiogenic methane deposits ===
Panhandle-Hugoton field (Anadarko Basin) in the south-central United States is the most important gas field with commercial helium content. Some abiogenic proponents interpret this as evidence that both the helium and the natural gas came from the mantle.

The Bạch Hổ oil field in Vietnam has been proposed as an example of abiogenic oil because it is 4,000 m of fractured basement granite, at a depth of 5,000 m. However, others argue that it contains biogenic oil which leaked into the basement horst from conventional source rocks within the Cửu Long basin.

A major component of mantle-derived carbon is indicated in commercial gas reservoirs in the Pannonian Basin and Vienna Basin of Hungary and Austria.

Natural gas pools interpreted as being mantle-derived are the Shengli Field and Songliao Basin, northeastern China.

The Chimaera gas seep, near Çıralı, Antalya (southwest Turkey), has been continuously active for millennia and it is known to be the source of the first Olympic fire in the Hellenistic period. On the basis of chemical composition and isotopic analysis, the Chimaera gas is said to be about half biogenic and half abiogenic gas, the largest emission of biogenic methane discovered; deep and pressurized gas accumulations necessary to sustain the gas flow for millennia, posited to be from an inorganic source, may be present. Local geology of Chimaera flames, at exact position of flames, reveals contact between serpentinized ophiolite and carbonate rocks. Fischer–Tropsch process can be suitable reaction to form hydrocarbon gases.

== Geological arguments ==
=== Incidental arguments for abiogenic oil ===
Given the known occurrence of methane and the probable catalysis of methane into higher atomic weight hydrocarbon molecules, various abiogenic theories consider the following to be key observations in support of abiogenic hypotheses:

- the serpentinite synthesis, graphite synthesis and spinel catalysation models prove the process is viable
- the likelihood that abiogenic oil seeping up from the mantle is trapped beneath sediments which effectively seal mantle-tapping faults
- outdated mass-balance calculations for supergiant oilfields which argued that the calculated source rock could not have supplied the reservoir with the known accumulation of oil, implying deep recharge.
- the presence of hydrocarbons encapsulated in diamonds

The proponents of abiogenic oil also use several arguments which draw on a variety of natural phenomena in order to support the hypothesis:

- the modeling of some researchers shows the Earth was accreted at relatively low temperature, thereby perhaps preserving primordial carbon deposits within the mantle, to drive abiogenic hydrocarbon production
- the presence of methane within the gases and fluids of mid-ocean ridge spreading centre hydrothermal fields.
- the presence of diamond within kimberlites and lamproites which sample the mantle depths proposed as being the source region of mantle methane (by Gold et al.).

=== Incidental arguments against abiogenic oil ===
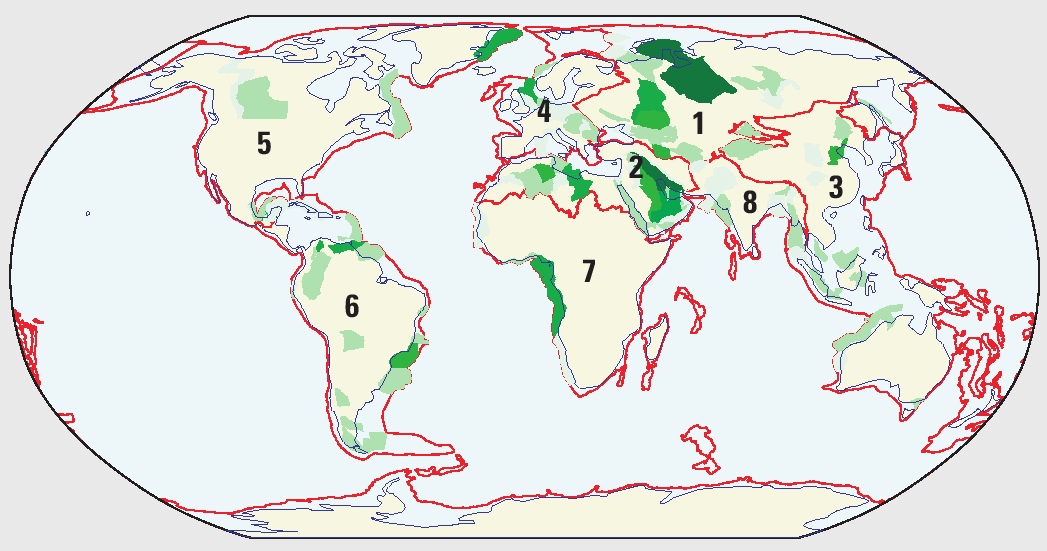
Oil deposits are not directly associated with tectonic structures.

Arguments against chemical reactions, such as the serpentinite mechanism, being a source of hydrocarbon deposits within the crust include:

- the lack of available pore space within rocks as depth increases.
  - this is contradicted by numerous studies which have documented the existence of hydrologic systems operating over a range of scales and at all depths in the continental crust.
- the lack of any hydrocarbon within the crystalline shield areas of the major cratons, especially around key deep-seated structures which are predicted to host oil by the abiogenic hypothesis. See Siljan Lake.
- lack of conclusive proof that carbon isotope fractionation observed in crustal methane sources is entirely of abiogenic origin (Lollar et al. 2006)
- drilling of the Siljan Ring failed to find commercial quantities of oil, thus providing a counter example to Kudryavtsev's Rule and failing to locate the predicted abiogenic oil.
- helium in the Siljan Gravberg-1 well was depleted in ^{3}He and not consistent with a mantle origin
  - The Gravberg-1 well only produced 84 barrels (13.4 m^{3}) of oil, which later was shown to derive from organic additives, lubricants and mud used in the drilling process.
- Kudryavtsev's Rule has been explained for oil and gas (not coal)—gas deposits which are below oil deposits can be created from that oil or its source rocks. Because natural gas is less dense than oil, as kerogen and hydrocarbons are generating gas the gas fills the top of the available space. Oil is forced down, and can reach the spill point where oil leaks around the edge(s) of the formation and flows upward. If the original formation becomes completely filled with gas then all the oil will have leaked above the original location.
- ubiquitous diamondoids in natural hydrocarbons such as oil, gas and condensates are composed of carbon from biological sources, unlike the carbon found in normal diamonds.

=== Field test evidence ===
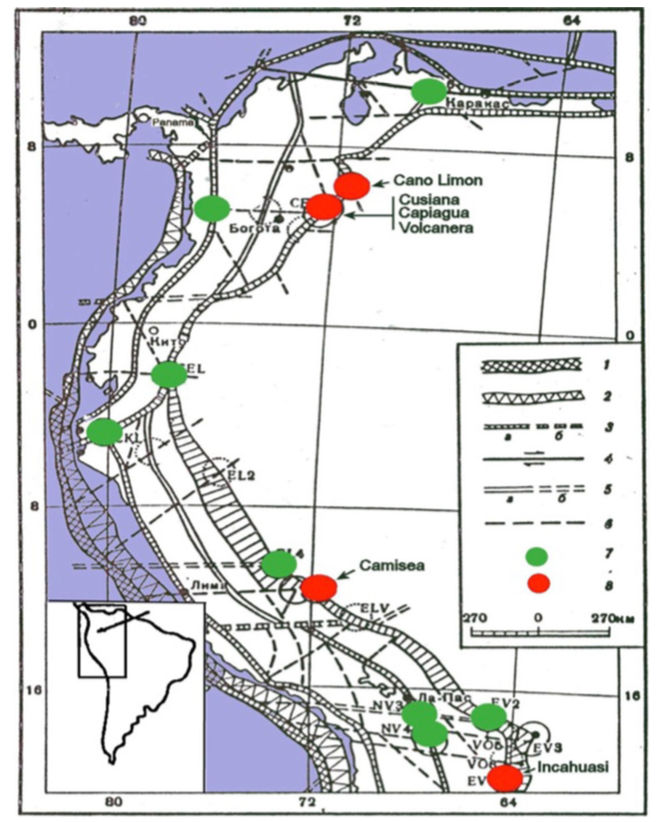
A prognostic map of the Andes in South America published in 1986. Red and green circles are sites predicted as future discoveries of giant oil/gas fields. Red circles are where discoveries were made. Green ones are still underdeveloped.

What unites both theories of oil origin is the low success rate in predicting the locations of giant oil/gas fields: according to the statistics discovering a giant demands drilling 500+ exploration wells. A team of American-Russian scientists (mathematicians, geologists, geophysicists, and computer scientists) developed an Artificial Intelligence software and the appropriate technology for geological applications, and used it for predicting places of giant oil/gas deposits.

In 1986, the team published a prognostic map for discovering giant oil and gas fields at the Andes in South America based on abiogenic petroleum origin theory. The model proposed by Prof. Yury Pikovsky (Moscow State University) assumes that petroleum moves from the mantle to the surface through permeable channels created at the intersection of deep faults.

The technology uses 1) maps of morphostructural zoning, which outlines the morphostructural nodes (intersections of faults), and 2) pattern recognition program that identify nodes containing giant oil/gas fields. It was forecast that eleven nodes, which had not been developed at that time, contain giant oil or gas fields. These 11 sites covered only 8% of the total area of all the Andes basins. 30 years later (in 2018) was published the result of comparing the prognosis and the reality.

Since the publication of the prognostic map in 1986, six giant oil/gas fields were discovered in the Andes region: Caño Limón oilfield, Cusiana, Capiagua, Colombia, and Volcanera (Llanos basin, Colombia), Camisea (Ukayali basin, Peru), and Incahuasi (Chaco basin, Bolivia). All discoveries were made in places shown on the 1986 prognostic map as promising areas.

During the 1960s, Donald Hings was issued numerous patents for developing practical methods for locating likely locations of the deep morphological nodes most likely to indicate the presence of abiogenic hydrocarbons. His methods and technologies are used to this day by geophysicists to locate deep hydrocarbon deposits.

== Extraterrestrial argument ==
The presence of methane on Saturn's moon Titan and in the atmospheres of Jupiter, Saturn, Uranus and Neptune is cited as evidence of the formation of hydrocarbons without biological intermediate forms, for example by Thomas Gold. (Terrestrial natural gas is composed primarily of methane). Some comets contain massive amounts of organic compounds, the equivalent of cubic kilometers of such mixed with other material; for instance, corresponding hydrocarbons were detected during a probe flyby through the tail of Halley's Comet in 1986.

Drill samples from the surface of Mars taken in 2015 by the Curiosity Rover's Mars Science Laboratory revealed the presence of benzene and propane in 3 billion-year-old rock samples taken from Gale Crater.

== See also ==
- Fossil fuel
- Peak oil

== Bibliography ==
- Kudryavtsev N.A., 1959. Geological proof of the deep origin of Petroleum. Trudy Vsesoyuz. Neftyan. Nauch. Issledovatel Geologoraz Vedoch. Inst. No.132, pp. 242–262 (in Russian)
