= Commission for the Study of the Natural Productive Forces =

The Commission for the Study of the Natural Productive Forces (Kommissiia po izucheniiu estestvennykh proizvoditel'nykh sil – KEPS) was established in Imperial Russia in 1915 to study the previously unexplored natural resources of the empire. Vladimir Vernadsky played a key role in its creation. In 1915 he published War and the Progress of Science in which he stressed the importance of science as regards to its contribution to the war effort:

After the war of 1914–1915 we will have to make known and accountable the natural productive forces of our country, i.e. first of all to find means for broad scientific investigations of Russia's nature and for the establishment of a network of well equipped research laboratories, museums and institutions ... This is no less necessary than the need for an improvement in the conditions of our civil and political life, which is so acutely perceived by the entire country.

== Department for the Industrial Geographical Study of Russia (DIGS) ==
Andrey Aleksandrovich Grigoryev proposed the creation of the Department for the Industrial Geographical Study of Russia, which was founded in 1918.
