= Pyotr Kropotkin (geologist) =

Russian geologist, tectonician, and geophysicist (1910–1996)

Pyotr Nikolayevich Kropotkin (Russian: Пётр Никола́евич Кропо́ткин; November 24, 1910, Moscow – 17 January 1996, Moscow) was a Soviet Russian geologist, tectonician, and geophysicist.

Kropotkin came from an aristocratic family, he was the grand-nephew of the anarchist prince Peter Kropotkin.

His main publications were devoted to tectonics and its relationships with magmatism and to tectonic and geophysical problems. He developed a theory of the Earth's outgassing and abyssal inorganic origin of petroleum and coined the terms "cold outgassing".

Kropotkin graduated from Moscow Geological Exploration Institute (MGRI) in 1932. He took part in prospecting for oil in the West Urals. Since 1936 he was with Geological Institute of Russian Academy of Sciences (RAS). He was elected a RAS Academician in 1992 and was awarded the Demidov Prize in 1994.

== Selected publications ==
- Kropotkin P.N., 1955. "Problems of oil genesis". Soviet Geology Jour., no. 47. pp. 104–125 (in Russian)
- Kropotkin P.N. and Shakhvarstova K.A., 1959. Solid bitumens, oil, and combustible gases in hyperbasite intrusions, traps, and volacinic pipes. In: Problems of oil migration and formation of oil and gas accumulations. - Moscow, GosTopTechIzdat. - pp. 151–164 (in Russian)
- Kropotkin P.N., 1986. Earth's outgassing and genesis of hydrocarbons. Mendeleev All-Union Chem. Soc. Jour. – Moscow, [Khimiya] Chemistry, vol. XXXI (5). – pp. 540–546 (in Russian)
- Kropotkin P.N., 1992. Inorganic origin of oil and combustible gases. Earth and Universe Jour., no. 1. - pp. 23–29 (in Russian)

== See also ==
- Abiogenic petroleum origin
