= Grygori N. Dolenko =

Ukrainian geologist

Grygori Nazarovych Dolenko Ukrainian: Григорій Назарович Доленко (Gaevka, Kirovograd Oblast, February 2, 1917 - Lviv, December 16, 1990) was a Ukrainian petroleum geologist.

Graduated from Kharkiv University (1940). Worked for ChernomorNeft, KhadyzhenNeft, BuguruslanNeft, and UkrNefteRazvedka E&P companies and with Inst. of Geology and Geochemistry of Combustible Minerals of Nat'l Ac.Sci. Ukraine (NASU) since 1952 (Director, 1963–1982). NASU Corresponding Member (1964), NASU Academician (1979). Prof. Dolenko proposed the concept of mineral synthesis of oil and gas in the asthenosphere of the Earth's upper mantle. State Award laureate (1971) for the prospecting and discovery of oil and gas fields at great depths in the Dnieper-Donets basin and Carpathian Foredeep.

== Selected publications ==
- Dolenko G.N., 1962. Oil and gas geology of the Carpathians. - Kiev, Ukr.SSR Ac. Sci. Publ. - 368 p. (in Russian)
- Dolenko G.N., 1966. Regularities of petroleum accumulation in the Earth's crust and the theory on inorganic oil and gas synthesis. In: Problem of oil and gas origin and formation of their commercial accumulations. - Kiev, Naukova Dumak Publ. - p. 3-25 (in Russian)
- Dolenko G.N., 1975. On the problem of oil and gas origin and formation of their commercial fields. In: Problems of geology and geochemistry of endogenous petroleum. - Kiev, Naukova Dumka Publ. - p. 40-51 (in Russian)
- Dolenko G.N., 1984. Origin of petroleum and its accumulation in the Earth's crust. - Kiev, Naukova Dumka Publ. - 135 p. (in Russian)
- Dolenko G.N., 1990. Geology and geochemistry of oil and gas. - Kiev, Naukova Dumka Publ. - 256 p. (in Russian)

== See also ==
- Abiogenic petroleum origin
- Lviv
