= Rimsky-Korsakov Archipelago =

Archipelago in Peter the Great Gulf

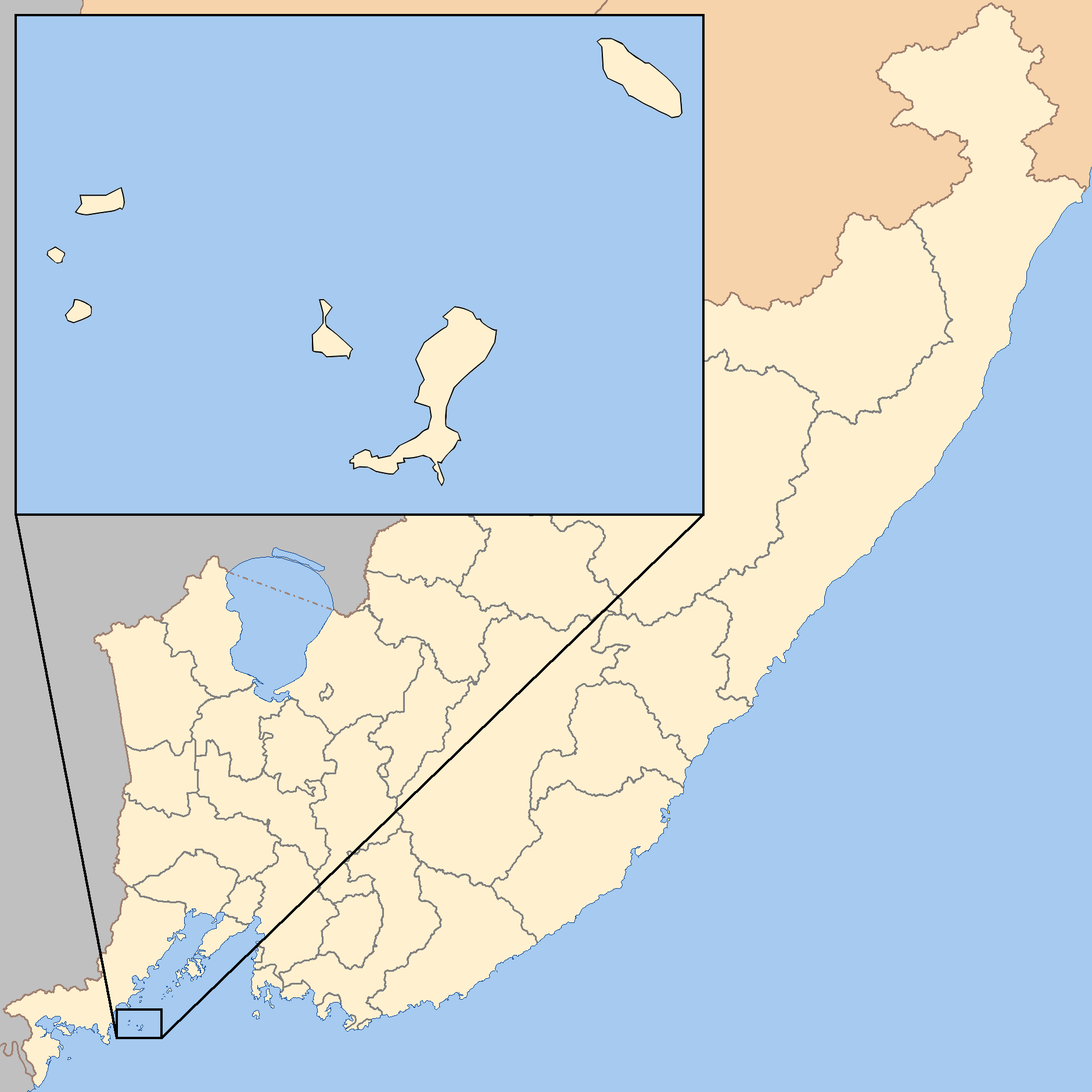

Rimsky-Korsakov Archipelago (42°42′N 131°26′E, Russian: Архипелаг Римского-Корсакова) is a group of six small islands and few kekurs (rocky islets) in Peter the Great Gulf of Sea of Japan under administration of Khasansky District. Islands are located approximately 70 km (43 mi) to southwest of Vladivostok.

The archipelago is uninhabited and has area of approximately 6 square kilometres. The highest point is 144 m (472 ft) (Stenin Island). The largest island is Bolshoy Pelis (4 km^{2}).

Islands were discovered for Europeans by French whalers in 1851 and named Iles pelée. Later the archipelago was named after commander of schooner Vostok Voin Rimsky-Korsakov.

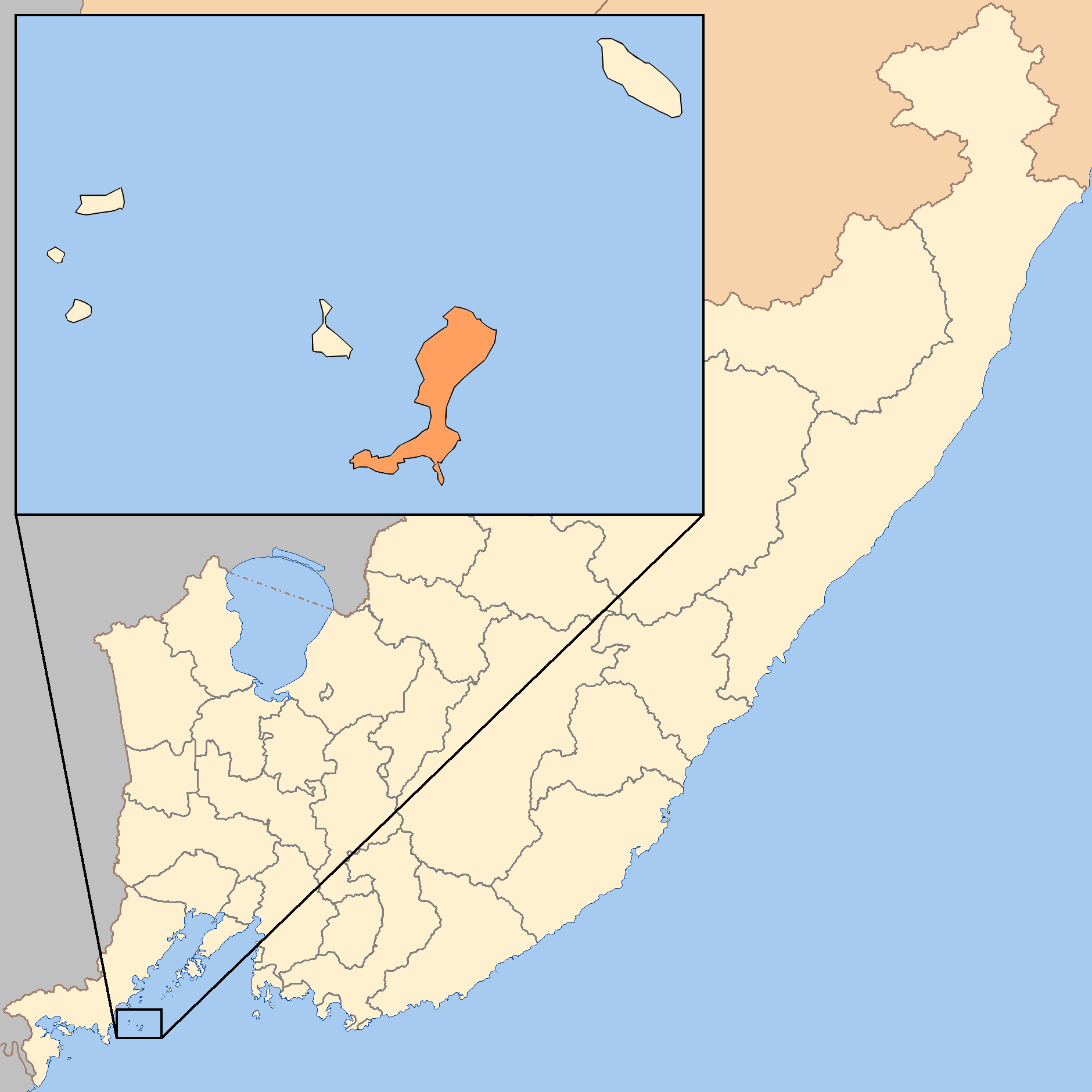
Bolshoy Pelis

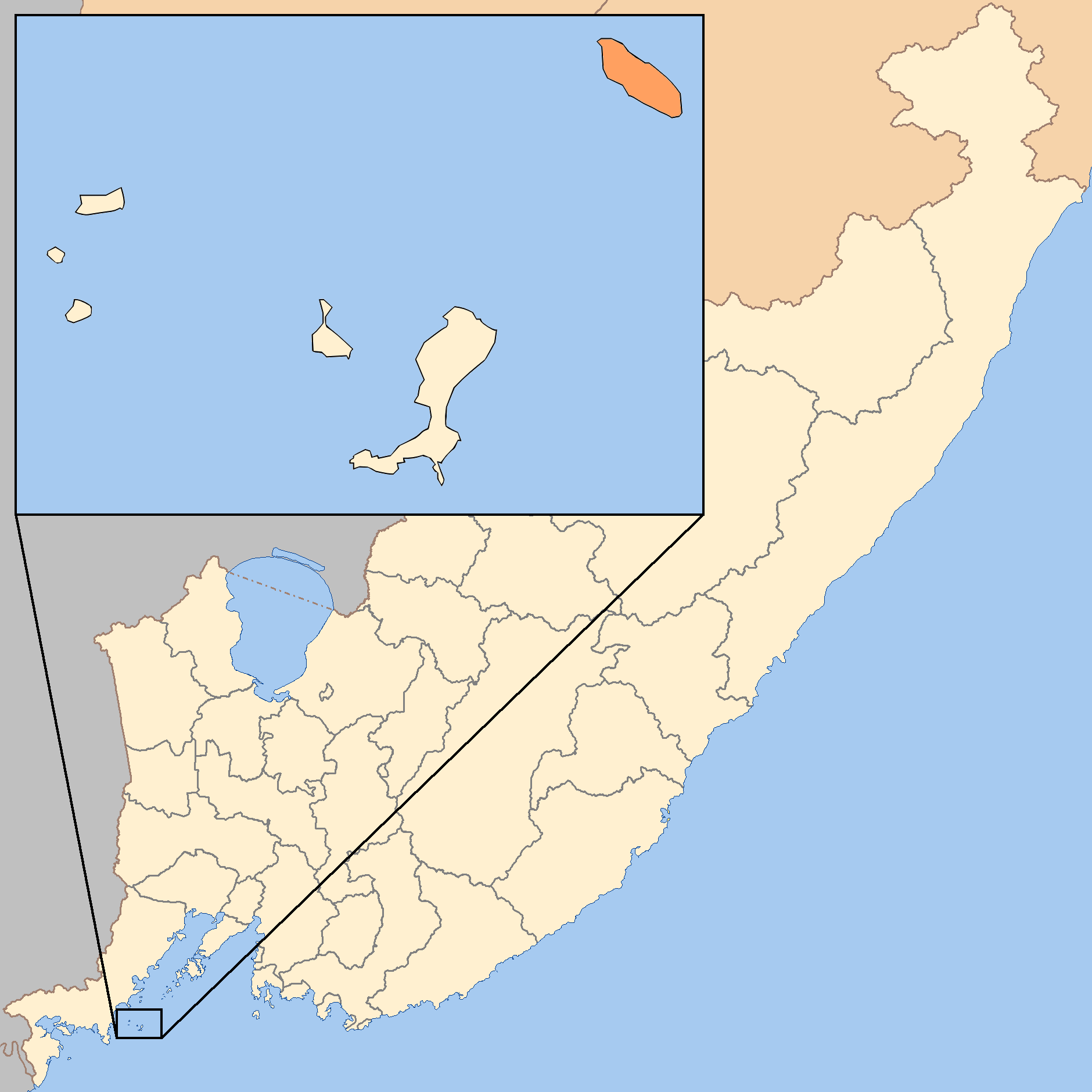
Stenin Island

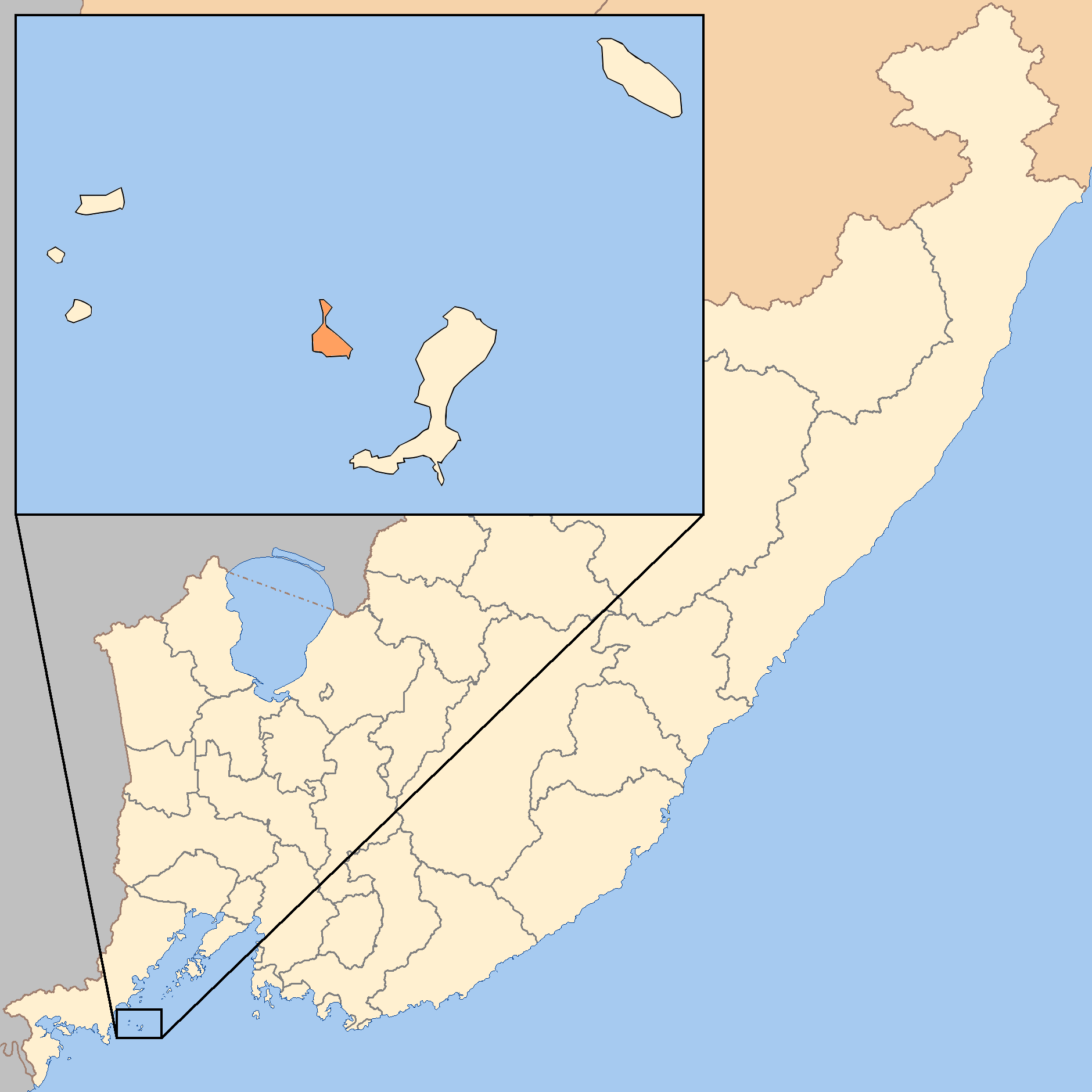
Matveeva Island

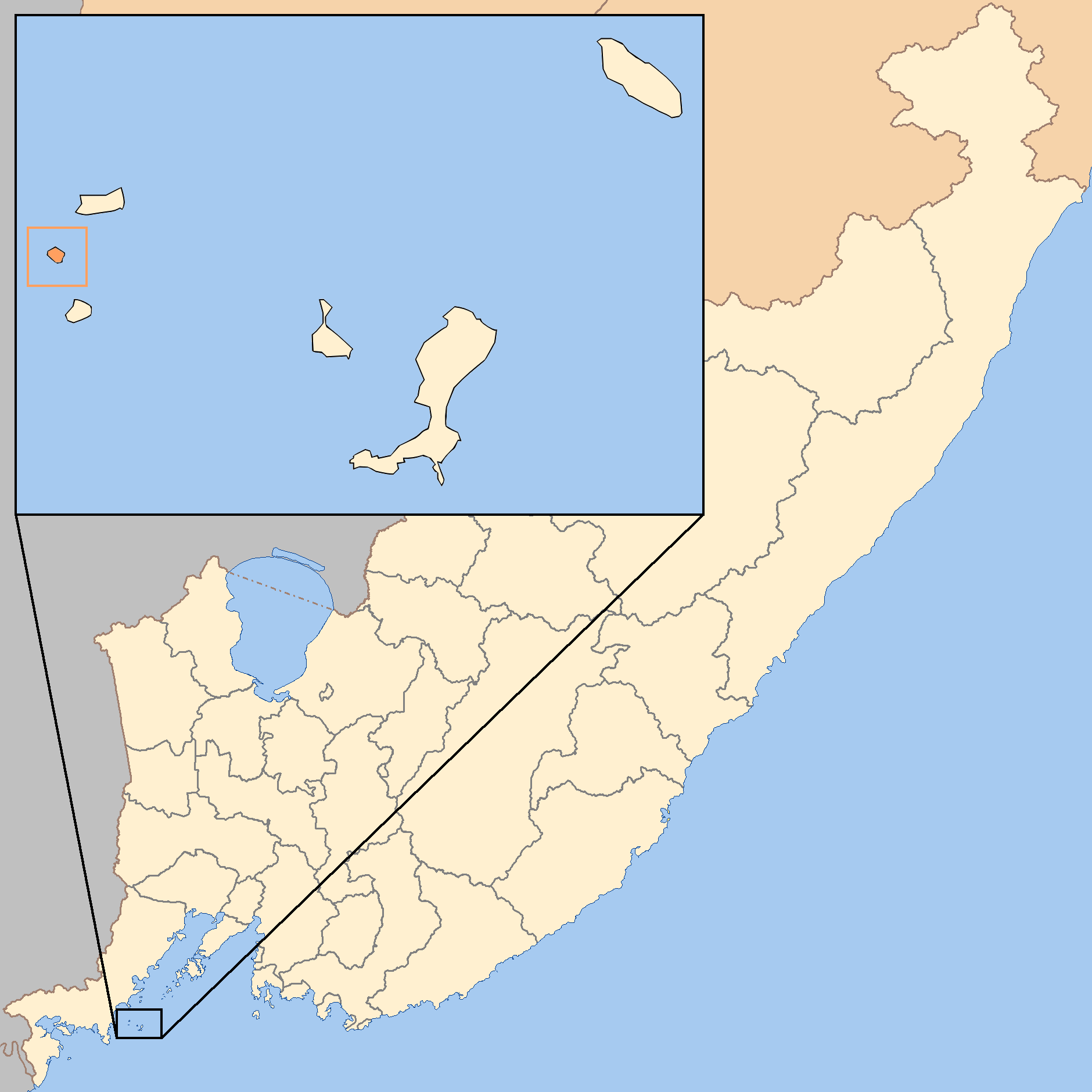
Hildebrandt Island

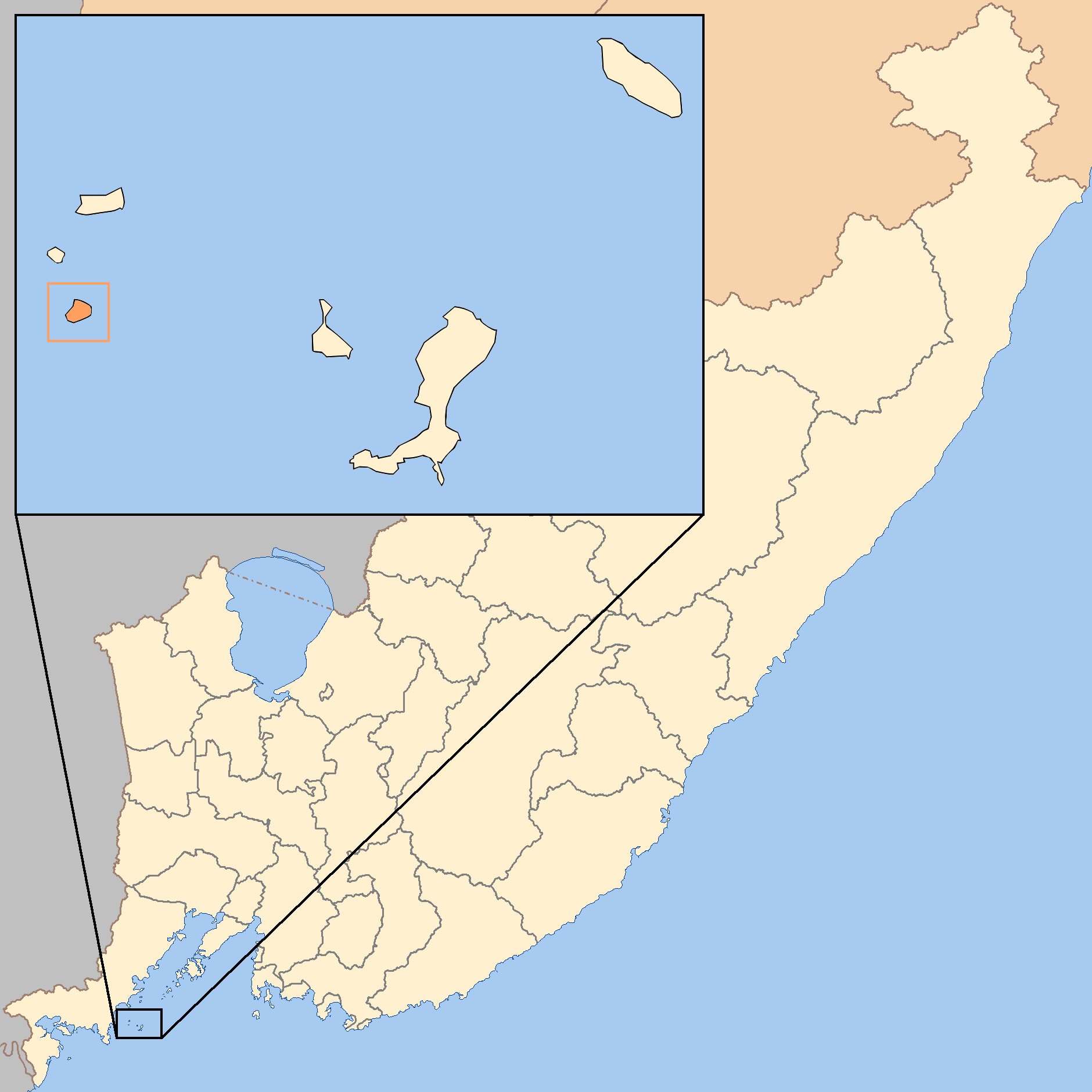
Durnovo Island

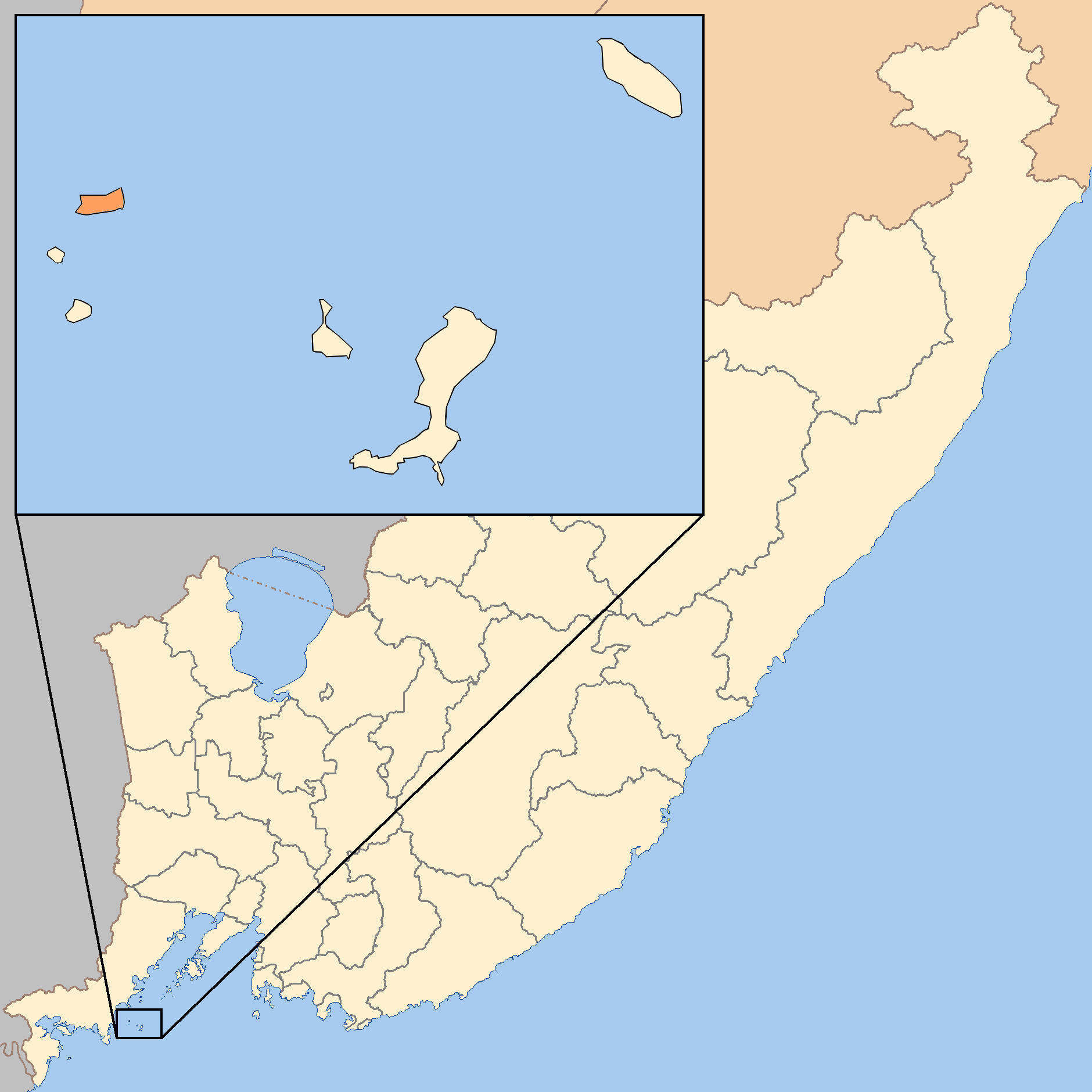
De Livrone Island
