= Georgi Boyko =

Georgi (Yuri) Boyko, or Heorhii Boiko (Ukrainian: Георгій Юхимович Бойко; March 10, 1933 in Boryslav – July 19, 2002 in Lviv) was a Ukrainian and Soviet petroleum geologist, one of the supporters and developers of the abiogenic petroleum origin hypothesis.

Boyko graduated from the Lviv Polytechnic Institute in 1955 and received a Ph.D. in Geology and Mineralogy from Lviv University in 1963 and Dr.Sc. in Geology and Mineralogy from the Institute of Geology and Development of Fossil Fuels (IGIRGI), Moscow, in 1989. He published five monographs and about 150 research papers, and was a vice president of the Ukrainian Oil and Gas Academy.

== Selected publications ==
- Boyko G. E. and Chekaliuk E.B., 1966. Thermodynamic criteria of oil origin. In: Problem of oil and gas origin and formation of their commercial accumulations. - Kiev, Naukova Dumka Publ. - p. 81-90 (in Russian)
- Boyko G. E., 1968. The Transformation of Abyssal Petroleum under the Conditions of the Earth's Crust. – Kiev, Naukova Dumka Publ.
- Boyko G. E., 1982. The Prediction of the Presence of Oil and Gas from Genetic Indices. – Kiev, Naukova Dumka Publ.
