= Scaled particle theory =

Equilibrium theory of hard-sphere fluids

The Scaled Particle Theory (SPT) is an equilibrium theory of hard-sphere fluids which gives an approximate expression for the equation of state of hard-sphere mixtures and for their thermodynamic properties such as the surface tension.

== One-component case ==
Consider the one-component homogeneous hard-sphere fluid with molecule radius $R$. To obtain its equation of state in the form $p=p(\rho,T)$ (where $p$ is the pressure, $\rho$ is the density of the fluid and $T$ is the temperature) one can find the expression for the chemical potential $\mu$ and then use the Gibbs–Duhem equation to express $p$ as a function of $\rho$.

The chemical potential of the fluid can be written as a sum of an ideal-gas contribution and an excess part: $\mu=\mu_{id}+\mu_{ex}$. The excess chemical potential is equivalent to the reversible work of inserting an additional molecule into the fluid. Note that inserting a spherical particle of radius $R_0$ is equivalent to creating a cavity of radius $R_0+R$ in the hard-sphere fluid. The SPT theory gives an approximate expression for this work $W(R_0)$. In case of inserting a molecule $(R_0=R)$ it is

$$\frac{\mu_{ex}}{kT}=\frac{W(R)}{kT}=-\ln(1-\eta)+\frac{6\eta}{1-\eta}+\frac{9\eta^2}{2(1-\eta)^2}+\frac{p\eta}{kT\rho}$$,

where $\eta\equiv\frac{4}{3}\pi R^3\rho$ is the packing fraction, $k$ is the Boltzmann constant.

This leads to the equation of state

$$\frac{p}{kT\rho}=\frac{1+\eta+\eta^2}{(1-\eta)^3}$$

which is equivalent to the compressibility equation of state of the Percus-Yevick theory.
