= Maukhida Abdulkabirova =

Soviet geologist

- Abdulkabirova in her laboratory
- Born: November 4, 1917
- Died: 2003 (aged 85–86)
- Education: Satbayev Kazakh National Research Technical University
- Occupations: Geologist; metallurgist; stratigraphist

Maukhida Atnagulovna Abdulkabirova (Russian: Маухида Атнагуловна Абдулкабирова; Kazakh: Маухида Атнағұлқызы Абдулкабирова; 1917–2003) was a Soviet geologist, metallurgist and stratigraphic researcher from Kazakhstan. She worked for the Institute of Geological Sciences of the Academy of Sciences of Kazakhstan, and became Head of Special Metals Sector and Scientific Advisor.

== Career ==
Adbulkabirova was educated at the Kazakh Mining and Metallurgical Institute, graduating in 1941. Abdulkabirova revealed the patterns of location of deposits in Northern Kazakhstan and compiled forecasted geological maps of this region.

From 1943, Abdulkabirova worked at the Institute of Geological Sciences of the Academy of Sciences of Kazakhstan and held numerous posts, working her way up to the posts of senior research assistant, then Head of Special Metals Sector and Scientific Advisor from 1993. She was known to her colleagues for her enquiring mind and her modest character.

== Research interests ==
Abdulbakoriva's many research interests include:

- Soil development in North Kazakhstan and its implications for mining and field patterning
- Geological mapping of the region
- Mine exploration
- The potential for the diamond industry in the region, including the Kummalkol Diamond Mine

== Awards ==
- 1990 – USSR State Prize
- 1987 – Medal for Labor

== Publications ==
During her career she wrote 115 scientific papers, including:

- Materials on petrography of metamorphic rocks of the Kokchetav district (1949 - Alma-Ata)
- Block-block structures and endogenous deposits of Northern Kazakhstan (1975)
- Ore formations, gold ore deposits (1980)
- Block-block structures and gold metallogeny of Kazakhstan (1982)
- Geology of Northern Kazakhstan: (Stratigraphy) (1987)
- Tectonics and the deep structure of Northern Kazakhstan (1988)
