= Mariya Borodayevskaya =

Soviet geologist and mineralogist

- Born: Mariya Borisovna Kessenikh; 9 December 1911; Tbilisi
- Died: 11 November 1994 (aged 82); Moscow
- Occupation: Geologist

Mariya Borisovna Borodaevskaya, née Kessenikh (9 December 1911, Tbilisi – 11 November 1994, Moscow) was a doctor of geological and mineralogical sciences, professor, specialist in gold and copper deposits. She was an Honored Worker of Science and Technology of the Russian Soviet Federative Socialist Republic, Commander of the Order of the Red Banner of Labour, two Orders of the Badge of Honour and other government awards, veteran of Central Scientific Research Geological Prospecting Institute of Non-ferrous and Precious Metals.

== Life ==
Mariya Kessenikh was born on 9 December 1911 in Tbilisi. She studied at the Leningrad Mining Institute. In 1934, Kessenikh graduated from the Moscow State Geological Prospecting Institute. She began her professional career at the All-Union Institute of Mineral Resources, then worked for some time at the Serkavzoloto trust, and two years later, in 1936, became an employee of the newly created Scientific Research Geological Prospecting Institute of Gold.

Kessenikh married Nikolay Borodaevsky. Together they researched the Berezovsky gold deposit and co-authored first scientific works. In 1949, Borodaevskaya defended her doctoral dissertation on the role of magmatism in the formation of gold deposits. She became the first doctor of geological and mineralogical sciences at NIGRIZoloto and soon has become a recognized expert on gold. She was also a chief specialist of the Mingeology of the USSR on copper.

During 1954-1972 Borodaevskaya was a Head of the Department of Geology at Central Scientific Research Geological Prospecting Institute of Non-ferrous and Precious Metals combining all geological research on gold, copper and diamonds. For many years, she was the curator of the USSR Ministry of Geology, the chairman of expert commissions on all-Union and mineral-raw material problems. From 1972 to 1982, Borodaevskaya headed the Department of geology, forecasting methods and prospecting for copper deposits.

She became the author and co-author of more than 200 scientific papers, including several monographs. More than 20 employees defended their candidate dissertations under her supervision, she was an opponent of a number of doctoral dissertations.

Mariya Borodayevskaya died on 11 November 1994 and was buried in Moscow at the Ostankino Cemetery.

== Awards ==
- Order of the October Revolution
- Order of the Red Banner of Labour
- Two Orders of the Badge of Honour
