= Andrey Aleksandrovich Grigoryev =

Andrey Aleksandrovich Grigoryev (1883-1968) was a Soviet and Russian geographer and geomorphologist. He proposed the creation of the Department for the Industrial Geographical Study of Russia (DIGS) of the Commission for the Study of the Natural Productive Forces, which occurred in 1918.

Grigoryev graduated as a zoologist from the Department of Physics and Mathematics of St. Petersburg University in 1907.
