= Vladimir Porfiriev =

Russian geologist (1899–1982)

Vladimir Borisovich Porfiriev (Russian: Влади́мир Бори́сович Порфи́рьев, Ukrainian: Володимир Борисович Порфир'єв; 26 June 1899, Vyatka – 30 January 1982, Kyiv) was a Soviet and Ukrainian petroleum and coal geologist.

Porfiriev was one of the major proponents of the theory of the origin of Abiogenic petroleum, that is, that petroleum was formed by primordial non-biological processes rather than from the decaying remains of plant and animal life.

== Early years ==
Vladimir Porfiriev was born to the family of the Zemstvo demographer. He graduated from 1st Vyatka Gymnasium in 1918 and then worked for the local demographic bureau. In 1919, Porfiriev joined the Red Army as a volunteer and took part in the Russian Civil War. After demobilisation, he studied at Perm University and then transferred to the Exploration Faculty of the Petrograd Mining Institute, where he graduated in 1926.

In 1924, while still a student, he started his geological and research career in the State Geological Committee, where he first worked in their West Siberia Section, and then for the Petroleum one (now VNIGRI). From 1929 to 1938, he worked as a geologist and head of the Central Asia Section at All-Union Petroleum Research Geoexploration Institute (VNIGRI), and a foreman for Central oblasts of Russian SFSR. Without defending a thesis, he received a PhD and professor degree in 1937. The next year, he defended a Doctor of Science dissertation in Geology and Mineralogy titled "Formation conditions of the Central Asia oil fields". He then headed studies on hydrocarbon potential evaluation at the Institute of Geological Sciences at Kyiv State University.

At the beginning of World War II, he was called up for military service in the Red Army, but soon was demobilized and sent to the Geological Institute at the Academic Sciences University in Tashkent, where he worked as senior researcher until 1944. Then he returned to Kyiv and headed the Petroleum Department at the Institute of Geological Sciences.

== Career achievements ==
In 1945, Porfiriev began a new phase of his career, beginning with his relocation to Lviv in the Western Ukraine. There he organized the Lviv Branch of the Institute of Geological Sciences, the Lviv Geological Society, the Physical Geology Department at Lviv State University, and established the Oil and Gas Fields Geology and Exploration Department at Lviv Polytech Institute, the first Ukrainian college for petroleum engineers.

Under his guidance, the Lviv Branch of the Institute of Geological Sciences became the Institute for Geology of Useful Minerals (1951), which was then transformed into Institute of Geology and Geochemistry of Combustible Minerals (1962). Prof. Porfiriev headed that institute till 1963, when he was nominated to the post of Director for Institute of Geological Sciences in Kyiv. From 1970 until his retirement, he headed the Department of Geology and Genesis of Oil and Gas fields at that institute.

Vladimir Porfiriev supervised 30 PhD and 8 Doctor of Sciences candidates. His pupils include academicians G.N. Dolenko and S.I. Subbotin, Corresponding Members of the Academy V.I. Kityk and N.R. Ladyzhensky, Dr. (Chemistry) I.V. Greenberg, Drs. (Geology and Mineralogy) R.S. Kopystyansky, V.A. Krayushkin, and V.F. Linetsky.

== Awards ==
- Corresponding Member (1951) and Academician (1957) of Ukrainian SSR Academy of Sciences.
- Order of the Red Banner of Labour (1947)
- Order of Lenin (1957)
- State Prize of the Ukrainian SSR in Science and Technology (1971)
- Order of the October Revolution (1979)

== Publications ==
Vladimir Porfiriev contributed to numerous scientific journals, and edited the "Reports of Academic Sciences of the Ukrainian SSR" and the "Geological Journal". He was a member of the Earth Sciences Division at the Presidium of the Academy from 1963 to 1968. He published 262 research works, including many monographs.

=== Articles ===
- Porfiriev V.B., 1930. Miut ozokerite deposit (Cheleken Island). - News GGRU, vol. 49, no. 8. - pp. 71–94 (in Russian)
- Porfiriev V.B., 1932. Oil field of the Boya-Dag and Syrtlan-Li Mts. and problems of its exploration. Proc. NIGRI, Series B, Fasc. 11. with a map. - pp. 1–21 (in Russian)
- Porfiriev V.B., 1933. Iodine-bromide formation waters of Turkmenia. - Moscow, Soviet Asia Press. - 79 p. (in Russian)
- Porfiriev V.B., 1938. Oil in Tajikistan (Formation conditions). - Moscow and Leningrad, USSR Ac. Sci. Publ. - 134 p. (in Russian)
- Porfiriev V.B., 1948. Metamorphism of carbofossils. - Lviv, Lviv Univ. Publ. - 183 p. (in Russian)
- Porfiriev V.B. and Linetsky V.F. Problems of oil migration. - Kharkiv, Kharkiv Univ. Publ. - 163 p. (in Russian)
- Porfiriev V.B., 1959. The speech in the discussion. In: Problems of oil migration and forming of oil and gas accumulations. - Moscow, GosTopTechIzdat. - pp. 165–193 (in Russian)
- Porfiriev V.B., 1961. On the nature of oil. Proc. Lviv Geol. Soc., no. 7-8. - p. 13-38 (in Russian)
- Porfiriev V.B, and Greenberg I.V., 1962. On the problem with techniques to study source rocks. In: Theoretical issues of petroleum geology. - Kyiv, Ukrainian SSR Ac. Sci. Publ. - p. 5-25 (in Russian)
- Porfiriev V.B., and Sozansky V.I., 1969. New trends for oil exploration. News of Ukrainian SSR Ac. Sci., no. 8. - pp. 32–40 (in Russian)
- Porfiriev V.B., 1974. Inorganic origin of petroleum. - AAPG Bull., vol. 58, no. 1. - pp. 3–33
- Porfiriev V.B., 1974. Geology and genesis of salt formations (a review on monograph by Sozansky V.I.). - AAPG Bull., vol. 58, no. 12. - pp. 2543–2544
- Porfiriev V.B., Dolenko G.N., Sollogub V.B. et al., 1975. Geological structure and development of platform areas in Ukraine and Northwest Africa in the context of hydrocarbon potential of the basement formations. - Kyiv, Naukova Dumka Publ. - 200 p. (in Russian)
- Porfiriev V.B., Krayushkin V.A., and Klochko V.P., 1982. Prospective trends in development of abiogenic oil concept. News of Ukrainian SSR Ac. Sci., no. 11. - pp. 38–42 (in Ukrainian)
- Porfiriev V.B., and Klochko V.P., 1982. Geological aspects of hydrocarbon productivity from the basement formations (West Siberia basin case study). In: Peculiarities of Earth's deep crust structure and theoretical substantiation of inoraganic genesis of petroleum. - Kyiv, Naukova Dumka Publ. - p. 5-155 (in Russian)

=== Books ===
- Porfiriev V.B., 1987. The nature of oil, gas, and carbofossils. Selected works. Volume I: Caustobioliths, oil and coal, 224 p. and Volume II: Abiogenic oil, 216 p. (in Russian)
- Vladimir Borisovich Porfiriev. Scientist, Geologist, Teacher, Person. P.F. Gozhyk, Ed. - Kyiv, IGS NASU Publ., 2000. - 364 p. (in Russian and English)
- Petroleum in the basement of sedimentary basins. Krayushkin V.A., Ed. - Kyiv, EKMO Publ. House, 2005. - 256 p.

== See also ==
- Abiogenic petroleum origin
