= Voin Rimsky-Korsakov =

Russian navigator (1822–1871)

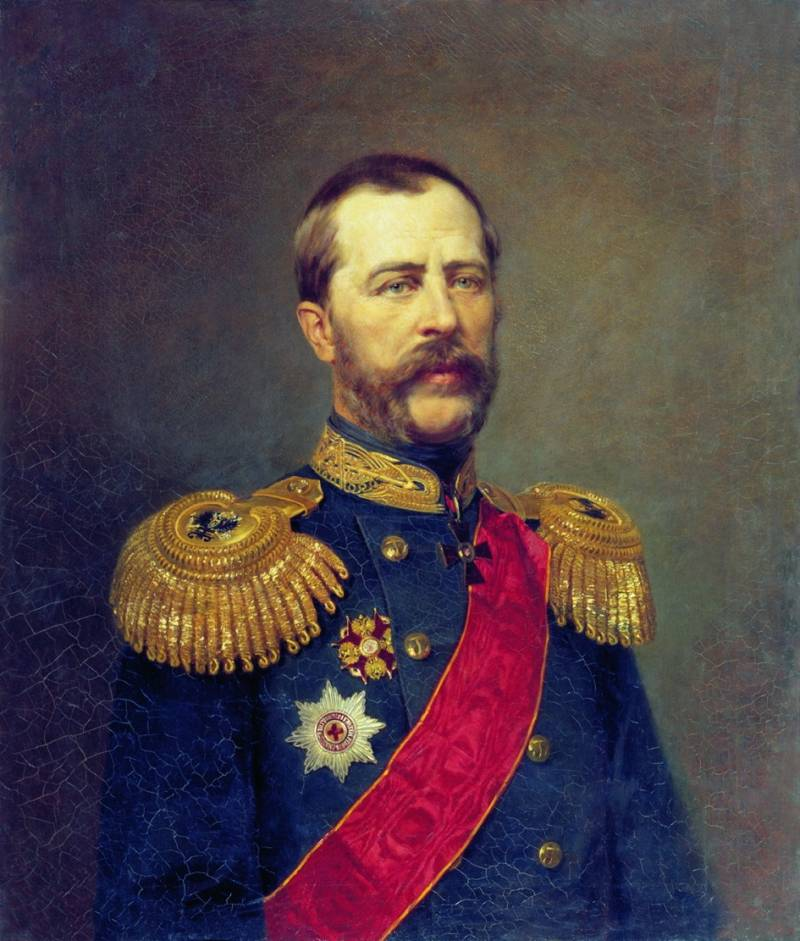
Voin Rimsky-Korsakov

Voin Andreyevich Rimsky-Korsakov (Russian: Воин Андреевич Римский-Корсаков, IPA: [ˈvoɪn ɐnˈdrʲeɪvʲɪtɕ ˈrʲimskʲɪj ˈkorsəkəf]; 1822–1871) was a Russian navigator, hydrographer and geographer. He was an elder brother of composer and conductor Nikolai Rimsky-Korsakov.

Rimsky-Korsakov was born in 1822 into a family of Russian nobility and graduated from the School for Mathematical and Navigational Sciences in Saint Petersburg. He served as a navy officer and commander of the schooner Vostok in the flotilla under the administration of Admiral Yevfimy Putyatin.

In the 1850s and 1860s Rimsky-Korsakov researched the area of the Sea of Japan near Ussuri Krai. Later a small archipelago was named after him.

Rimsky-Korsakov died at the age of 49 in 1871 in Pisa and was buried in Saint Petersburg.
