= Vladimir Vernadsky =

Soviet geochemist (1863–1945)

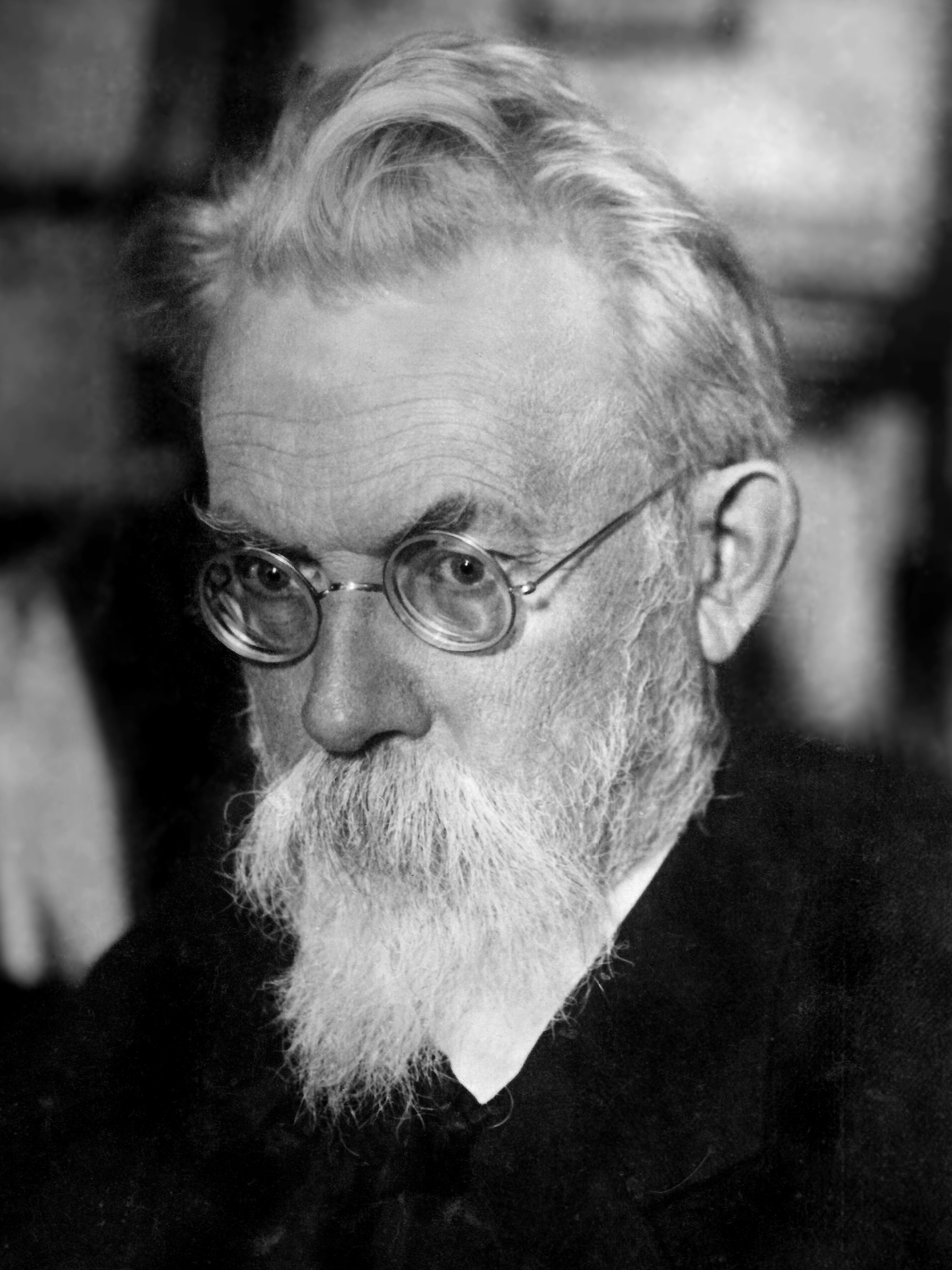
- Vernadsky in 1934
- Born: Vladimir Ivanovich Vernadsky; 12 March [O.S. 28 February] 1863; Saint Petersburg, Russian Empire
- Died: 6 January 1945 (aged 81); Moscow, Russian SFSR, Soviet Union
- Resting place: Novodevichy Cemetery, Moscow
- Education: Doctor of Science (1897)
- Alma mater: Saint Petersburg Imperial University
- Known for: Noosphere; Biogeochemistry
- Children: George Vernadsky
- Scientific career
- Fields: Geology, crystallography, mineralogy, geochemistry, radiogeology, biology, biogeochemistry, philosophy
- Workplaces: Moscow University Professor; National Academy of Science of Ukraine; Tavrida National V.I. Vernadsky University; Moscow Institute of Fine Chemical Technologies
- Thesis: Slip phenomena of crystalline matter

Vladimir Ivanovich Vernadsky (Russian: Владимир Иванович Вернадский), known in Ukraine as Volodymyr Ivanovych Vernadsky (Ukrainian: Володимир Іванович Вернадський; 12 March [O.S. 28 February] 1863 – 6 January 1945), was a Russian, Ukrainian, and Soviet mineralogist and geochemist who is considered one of the founders of geochemistry, biogeochemistry, and radiogeology. He was one of the founders and the first president of the Ukrainian Academy of Sciences (now National Academy of Sciences of Ukraine). Vladimir Vernadsky is most noted for his 1926 book The Biosphere in which he inadvertently worked to popularize Eduard Suess's 1875 term biosphere, by hypothesizing that life is the geological force that shapes the earth. In 1943 he was awarded the Stalin Prize. Vernadsky's portrait is depicted on the Ukrainian ₴1,000 hryvnia banknote.

== Early life ==
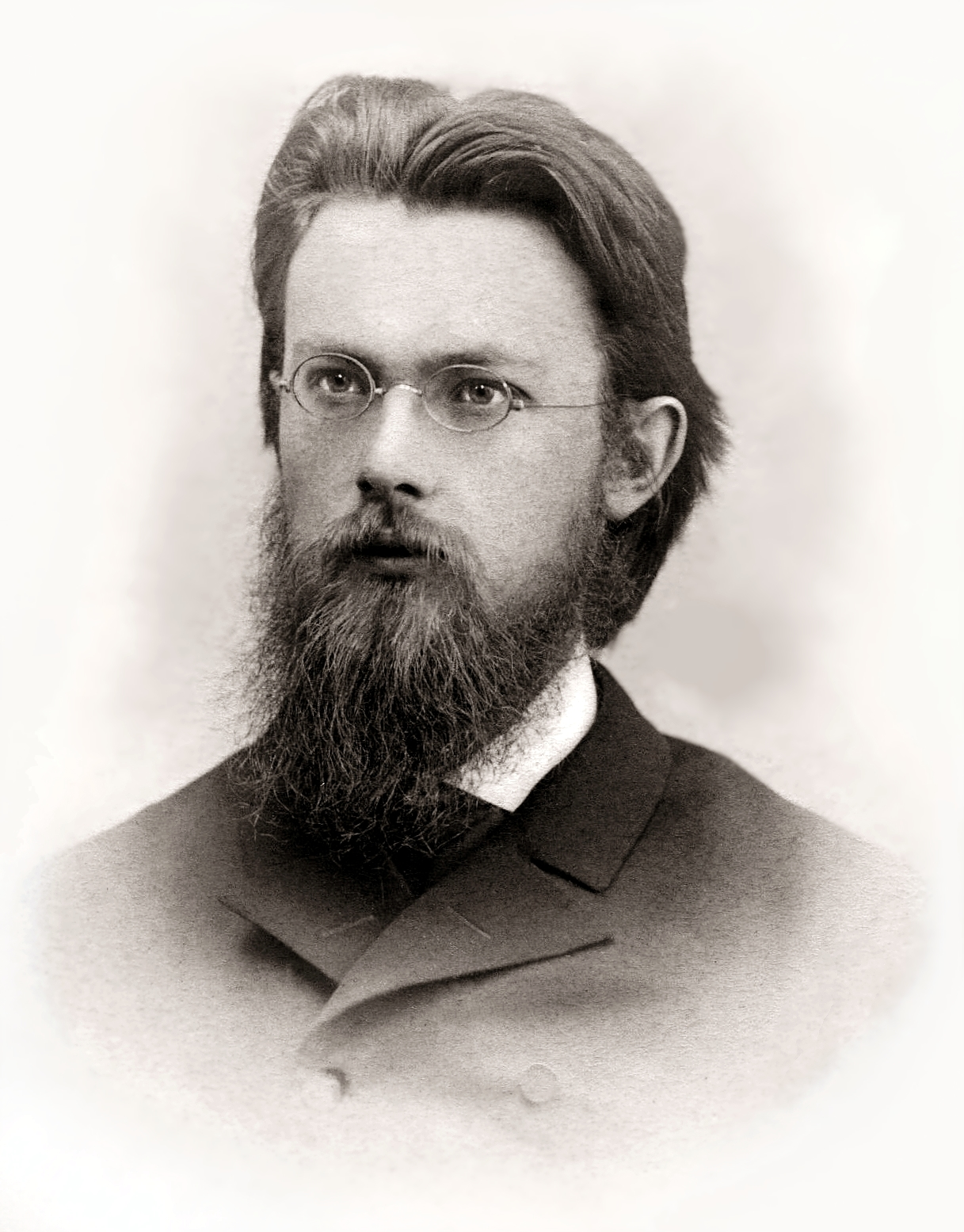
Vladimir Vernadsky, Paris 1889

Vernadsky was born in Saint Petersburg, Russian Empire, on 12 March [O.S. 28 February] 1863 in the family of the native Kiev residents Russian Imperial economist Ivan Vernadsky and Anna Konstantinovich, who came from an old Russian noble family, which was of Greek descent. According to family legend, his father's ancestors were Zaporozhian Cossacks. Ivan Vernadsky had been a professor of political economy in Kiev at the St. Vladimir University before moving to Saint Petersburg; then he was an Active State Councillor and worked in the Governing Senate in St. Petersburg. He was also an editor of a liberal journal which opposed censorship and serfdom. Anna Konstantinovich was a Ukrainian Cossack music instructor, of Greek descent.

In 1868 his family relocated to Kharkov, where he continued his education, and in 1873 he entered the Kharkov provincial gymnasium. His father gifted scientific books that included On the Origin of Species by Charles Darwin and Cosmos by Alexander Humboldt, which was his introduction to early evolutionary theory in relation to nature. Along with the books, his uncle Evgraf Korolenko, a retired civil servant, mentored Vernadsky, taking him on long walks under the stars to discuss the earth and the cosmos. This introduction turned Vernadsky's attention from humanities to science. Vernadsky graduated from Saint Petersburg State University in 1885. As the position of mineralogist in Saint Petersburg State University was vacant, and Vasily Dokuchaev, a soil scientist, and Alexey Pavlov, a geologist, had been teaching Mineralogy for a while, Vernadsky chose to enter Mineralogy.

Vernadsky chose it because of the proximity to his childhood home, which allowed him to care for his recently widowed mother. Vernadsky went on to study as faculty at Saint Petersburg State University in the Physics-Mathematics program where he specialized in crystallography and mineralogy. Vernadsky graduated in 1885 with a thesis on isomorphous mixtures in minerals.

In 1886, Vernadsky married Natalya E. Staritskaya.

In 1888–1890, he traveled through Europe, studying in Germany, France, England, Switzerland, and Italy, the museums of Paris and London, and worked in Munich and Paris. While abroad, he studied under Henry Le Chatelier, Paul Von Groth, and Ferdinand André Fouqué, supporting his decision to focus his studies in crystallography and mineralogy. While trying to find a topic for his doctorate, he first went to Naples to study under crystallographer Arcangelo Scacchi, who was senile by that time. Scacchi's condition led Vernadsky to go to Germany to study under Paul Groth, curator of minerals in the Deutsches Museum in Munich. Vernadsky learned to use Groth's modern equipment, which included a machine to study the optical, thermal, elastic, magnetic and electrical properties of crystals. He also gained access to the physics lab of Leonhard Sohncke (Direktor, Physikalisches Institut der Universität Jena, 1883–1886; Professor der Physik an der Technischen Hochschule München 1886–1897), who was studying crystallisation during that period. In the year 1888, Vernadsky had the opportunity to attend the 4th International Geological Congress held in London before moving on to study under Fouqué and Chatelier in Paris. In 1889, when Dokuchaev declined to attend, Vernadsky took over the World Exhibition in Paris on his behalf. His exhibit featured a display on Russian soils where he earned a gold medal for his organization and presentation.

Vernadsky's father had a huge influence on Vladimir. Vladimir later recalled that before moving from Kharkov to St. Petersburg, he and his father were abroad and in Milan, they read about a circular in Pyotr Lavrov's newspaper "Forward" that forbade printing in Ukrainian in Russia. In his memoirs, he wrote:

This made a huge impression on my father, and the conversations related to it had a strong effect on me at the time. My father told the history of Ukraine in a completely different way than it was taught in high school. He often mentioned that St. Petersburg was built on the bones of Ukrainians (St. Petersburg was built by Cossacks from Mazepa's regiments). Returning to St. Petersburg, I tried to get acquainted with Ukrainian literature. In my father's library I found various issues of "Osnova" and other Ukrainian publications. I obtained Ukrainian books from second-hand booksellers, and received some from abroad. I asked my father in detail about Shevchenko, Kulish, Maksimovich, Kvitka-Osnovyanenko, whom he knew personally, as well as about the Cyril and Methodius Brotherhood, about Kostomarov, etc.

In St. Petersburg, the 15-year-old boy noted in his diary on 29 March 1878:

Ukrainians are terribly oppressed. Even in Austria, Drahomanov was not allowed to publish a newspaper in Ukrainian. In Russia, it is absolutely forbidden to print books in my native language. During the holidays, I will take it up with all due diligence. In Kiev, if they see a portrait of Shevchenko in some house, they take it away…

== Political activities ==
Vernadsky participated in the First General Congress of the zemstvos, held in Petersburg on the eve of the 1905 Russian Revolution to discuss how best to pressure the government to the needs of the Russian society; became a member of the liberal Constitutional Democratic Party (KD); and served in parliament, resigning to protest the Tsar's proroguing of the Duma. He served as professor and later as vice rector of Moscow University, from which he also resigned in 1911 in protest over the government's reactionary policies.

Following the advent of the First World War, his proposal for the establishment of the Commission for the Study of the Natural Productive Forces (KEPS) was adopted by the Imperial Academy of Sciences in February 1915. He published War and the Progress of Science where he stressed the importance of science as regards to its contribution to the war effort:

After the war of 1914–1915 we will have to make known and accountable the natural productive forces of our country, i.e. first of all to find means for broad scientific investigations of Russia's nature and for the establishment of a network of well-equipped research laboratories, museums and institutions ... This is no less necessary than the need for an improvement in the conditions of our civil and political life, which is so acutely perceived by the entire country.

After the February Revolution of 1917, he served on several commissions of agriculture and education of the provisional government, including as assistant minister of education.

Vladimir Vernadsky had dual "Russian–Ukrainian" identity and considered the Ukrainian culture as part of Russian imperial culture, and even declined to become a Ukrainian citizen in 1918.

== Scientific activities ==
In 1898, Vernadsky moved to Moscow in order to teach at Moscow University. As head of the mineralogical office, he had the opportunity to restore the Freyesleben collection where he fully cataloged and systemized it. During his work as a professor at Moscow University, he conducted 65 field excursions across Russia with students to Siberia, Urals, Caucasus, and Crimea.

Through his work, Vernadsky first popularized the concept of the noosphere and deepened the idea of the biosphere to the meaning largely recognized by today's scientific community. The word 'biosphere' was invented by Austrian geologist Eduard Suess, whom Vernadsky met in 1911.

In Vernadsky's theory of the Earth's development, the noosphere is the third stage in the earth's development, after the geosphere (inanimate matter) and the biosphere (biological life). Just as the emergence of life fundamentally transformed the geosphere, the emergence of human cognition will fundamentally transform the biosphere. In this theory, the principles of both life and cognition are essential features of the Earth's evolution and must have been implicit in the earth all along.

Vernadsky's visionary pronouncements were not widely accepted in the West. However, he was one of the first scientists to recognize that the oxygen, nitrogen and carbon dioxide in the Earth's atmosphere result from biological processes. During the 1920s he published works arguing that living organisms could reshape the planets as surely as any physical force. Vernadsky was an important pioneer of the scientific bases for the environmental sciences.

Vernadsky was a member of the Russian Academy of Sciences since 1912, was a founder and first president of the Ukrainian Academy of Sciences, and was later a member of the Academy of Sciences of the Soviet Union. He was a founder of the National Library of Ukrainian State and worked closely with the Tavrida University in Crimea. During the Russian Civil War, he hosted gatherings of the young intellectuals who later founded Eurasianism in emigration.

In the late 1930s and early 1940s Vernadsky played an early advisory role in the Soviet atomic bomb project, as one of the most forceful voices arguing for the exploitation of nuclear power, the surveying of Soviet uranium sources, and having nuclear fission research conducted at his Radium Institute. He died, however, before a full project was pursued.

On religious views, Vernadsky was an atheist. He was interested in Hinduism and Rig Veda.

Vernadsky's son George Vernadsky (1887–1973) emigrated to the United States where he published numerous books on medieval and modern Russian history.

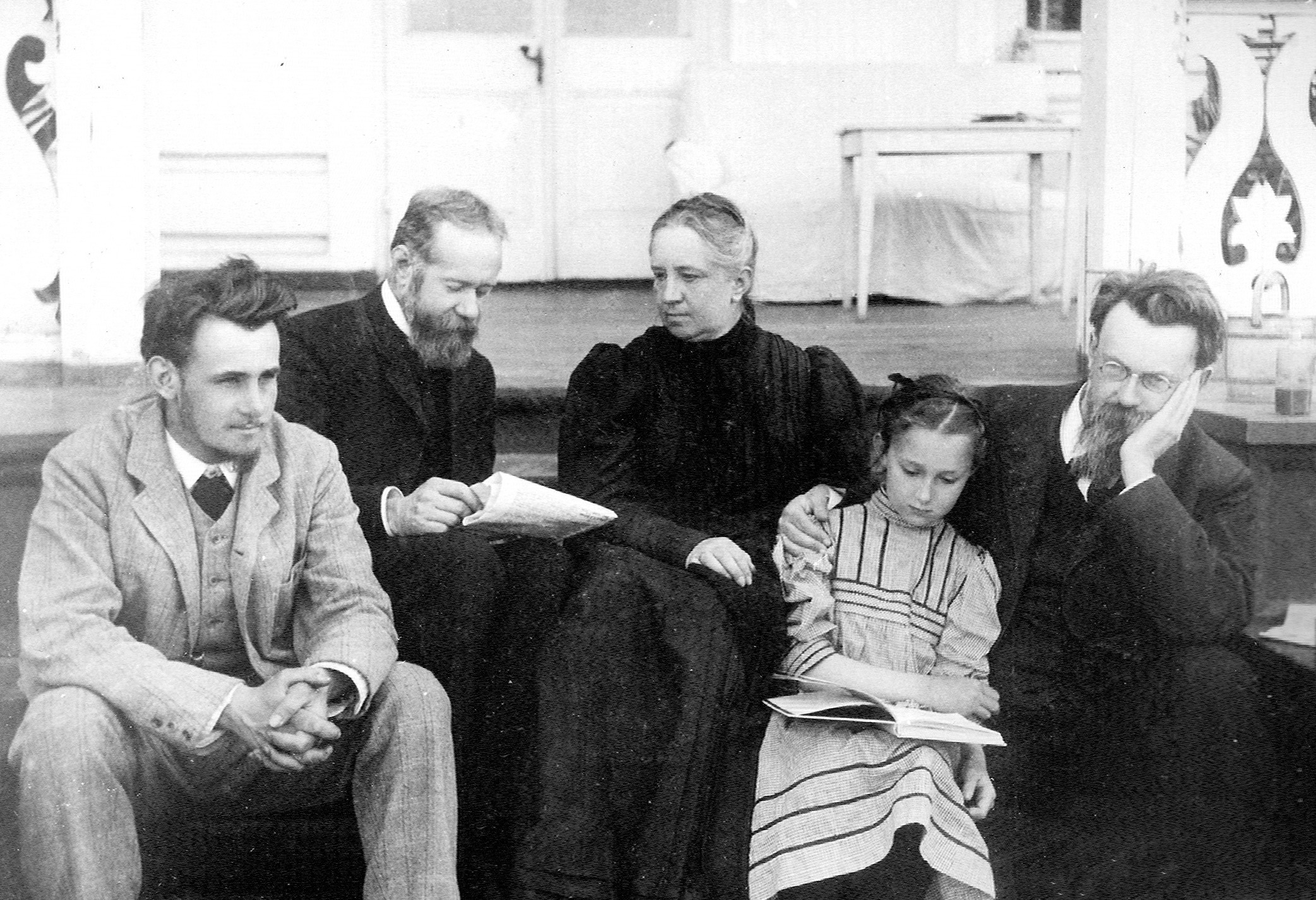
Vernadsky family in Poltava in 1908. Right-left: Vladimir, his daughter Nina, wife Nataliia and her brother Pavlo, son George.

== Legacy ==
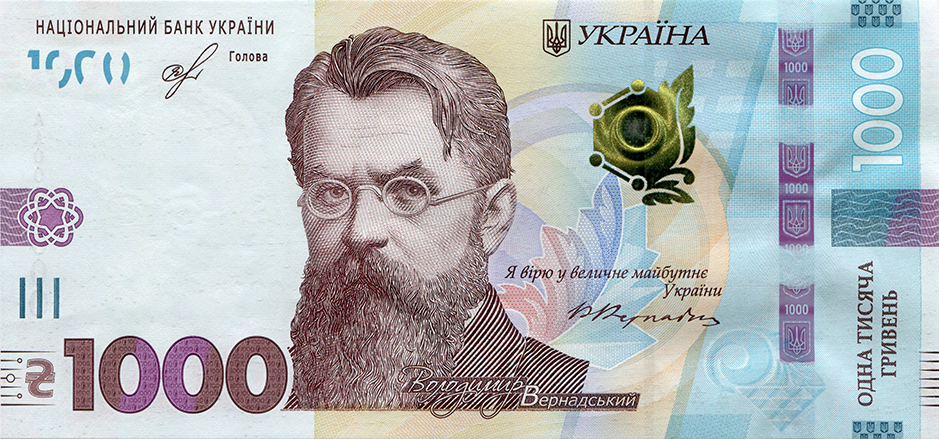
1000 hryvnia banknote (Ukraine's second largest) depicting Vladimir Vernadsky

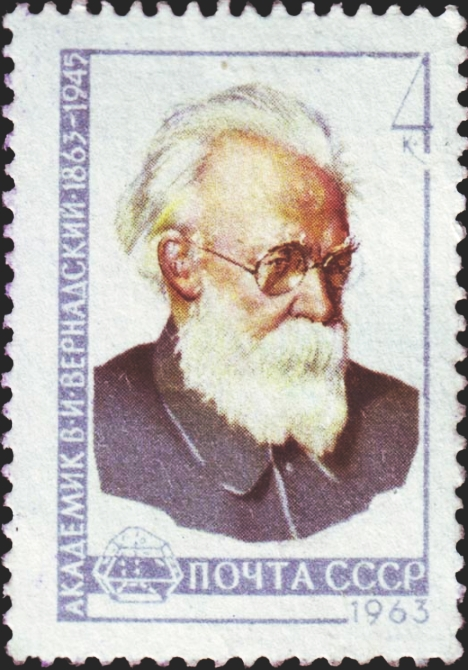
Vernadsky portrayed on a 1963 Soviet stamp

- Vernadsky National Library of Ukraine is the main academic library in Ukraine
- Ukrainian Antarctic station Akademik Vernadsky
- Tavrida National V.I. Vernadsky University, university in Simferopol
- Vernadsky Institute of Geochemistry and Analytical Chemistry, a research institution of the Russian Academy of Sciences
- Vernadsky State Geological Museum is the oldest museum in Moscow
- Vernadsky Mountain Range is a mountain in Antarctica and is an extension of the Gamburtsev Mountain Range.
- Several avenues in major cities in the former USSR, including Kyiv, Moscow and his native Saint Petersburg, bear his name.
- Vernadskiy (crater), a lunar crater
- Vernadsky Medal awarded annually by the International Association of GeoChemistry
- 2809 Vernadskij, an asteroid
- UNESCO sponsored an international scientific conference at Moscow State University, "Globalistics-2013", in honor of Vernadsky's 150th birthday
- On 25 October 2019 the National Bank of Ukraine put in circulation a ₴1,000 hryvnia banknote with Vernadsky's portrait.

== Selected works ==
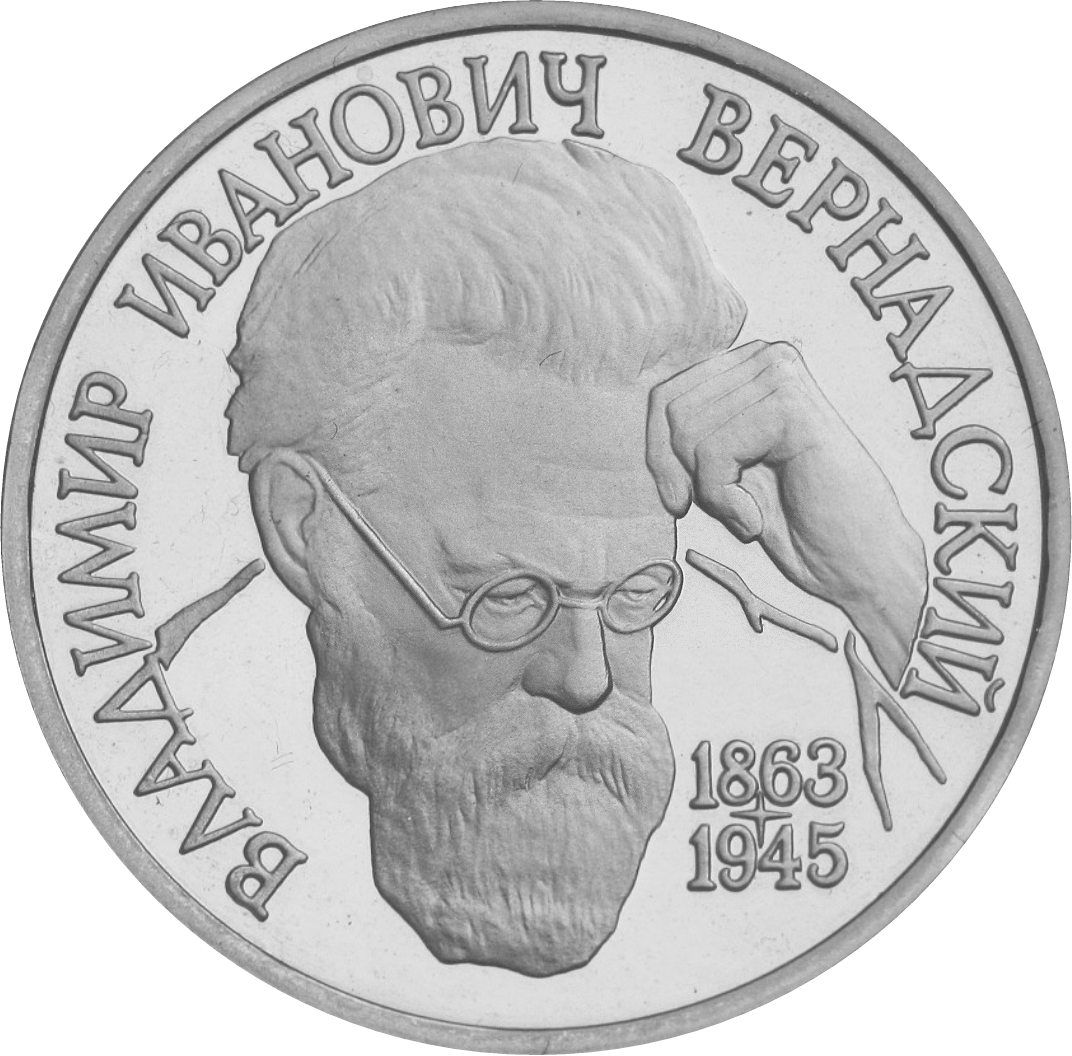
1993 Russian 1 rouble coin commemorating the 130th anniversary of Vernadsky's birth

- Geochemistry, published in Russian 1924
- The Biosphere, first published in Russian in 1926. English translations:
  - Oracle, AZ, Synergetic Press, 1986, ISBN 0-907791-11-5, 86 pp.
  - tr. David B. Langmuir, ed. Mark A. S. McMenamin, New York, Copernicus, 1997, ISBN 0-387-98268-X, 192 pp.
- Essays on Geochemistry & the Biosphere, tr. Olga Barash, Santa Fe, NM, Synergetic Press, ISBN 0-907791-36-0, 2006

=== Diaries ===
- Dnevniki 1917–1921: oktyabr 1917-yanvar 1920 (Diaries 1917–1921), Kyiv, Naukova dumka, 1994, ISBN 5-12-004641-X, 269 pp.
- Dnevniki. Mart 1921-avgust 1925 (Diaries 1921–1925), Moscow, Nauka, 1998, ISBN 5-02-004422-9, 213 pp.
- Dnevniki 1926–1934 (Diaries 1926–1934), Moscow, Nauka, 2001, ISBN 5-02-004409-1, 455 pp.
- Dnevniki 1935–1941 v dvukh knigakh. Kniga 1, 1935–1938 (Diaries 1935–1941 in two volumes. Volume 1, 1935–1938), Moscow, Nauka, 2006, ISBN 5-02-033831-1,444 pp.
- Dnevniki 1935–1941 v dvukh knigakh. Kniga 2, 1939–1941 (Diaries 1935–1941. Volume 2, 1939–1941), Moscow, Nauka, 2006, ISBN 5-02-033832-X, 295 pp.

== See also ==
- Gaia theory (science)
- Noosphere
- Pierre Teilhard de Chardin
- Prospekt Vernadskogo District
- Russian philosophy

Academic offices
Preceded by introduced	President of NANU; 1918–1919	Succeeded by Orest Levytskyi
