= Elizabeth Soshkina =

Soviet geologist and palaeontologist

Elizabeth Soshkina (1889–1963) was a Soviet geologist and palaeontologist. She worked at the Moscow State University from 1919 to 1930 teaching geology, and later worked at the Institute of Mineral Resources in Moscow. Her research was primarily palaeontological, and from 1942 to 1956 she worked at the Palaeontological Institute, teaching on Devonian and Silurian corals. She was a member of the Volga-Bashkir Expedition of the Russian Academy of Sciences, and gained her doctoral degree studying Devonian corals in the Urals.

== Early life ==
Elizabeth D. Soshkina was born in 1889 in Ryazan, Russian Empire. She was schooled at the Women's Gymnasium, Ryazan from 1909, graduating with a gold medal. She continued her education with studies of physics and mathematics at the Moscow Higher Women's Courses (now Moscow State University) from 1916 to 1918, while working as a teacher from 1913 to 1922 in Moscow.

== Career ==
Soshkina became an assistant professor teaching geology at Moscow State University from 1919 to 1930, but her primary area of research became palaeontology. Her department was moved to the Moscow Institute of Geological Expedition in 1930 and she taught there until 1942, when she took up a research position at the Petroleum Institute studying corals. She later moved to the Institute of Mineral Resources in Moscow.

Soshkina joined the staff of the Palaeontological Institute from 1942 to 1956. She taught the Devonian and Silurian corals of the Soviet Union, describing them and their ecological processes. She was a member of the Volga-Bashkir Expedition of the Russian Academy of Sciences between 1941 and 1943, which studied oil deposits in the Urals for the war effort. She gained her doctoral degree in 1946 on the Devonian corals of the Urals. She was appointed a professor in 1948 and continued her research into Palaeozoic rugoses.

She retired in 1956 and returned to Ryazan. Elizabeth Soshkina died there in 1963.
