= Yevdokim Zyablovskiy =

Russian geographer (1764–1846)

Yevdokim Filippovich Zyablovskiy (Note: Also romanized as Zyablovsky) (Russian: Евдоким Филиппович Зябловский; July 31, 1763 – March 30, 1846) (Note: Born 1763, according to Brockhaus and Efron; 1764 according to the Russian State Library. May have been born on July 31 of 1763) was a Russian geographer and academic.

In 1797 Zyablovskiy was appointed as professor of history and geography, and later of statistics, in the Saint Petersburg Teacher's Secondary School (called the Pedagogical Institute after 1803). From 1816 through 1833 he taught at Saint Petersburg University, being named Honored Professor in 1818, and Honorary Member of the University in 1846.

Zyablovskiy's works include:

- Brief Descriptive Geography of the Russian State (Saint Petersburg, 1787)
- New Descriptive Geography of the Russian Empire (Saint Petersburg: S. Selivanovskago, 1807)

"The latest geography of the Russian Empire: Composed according to its current division, which describes the borders of the state, its area, seas, rivers, lakes, mountains, water communications, climate, and land quality; natural products from all three kingdoms of nature; division into provinces, with enumeration of population, their industry, crafts, and factories; various inhabitants of the state, their languages, faith, celebrations, sciences and arts, domestic and foreign trade, and so on. With the addition of lands annexed from Prussia according to the Tilsit Treaty, concluded on June 27, 1807."

- Statistical Description of the Russian Empire with a Statistical Review of Europe (Saint Petersburg, 1808 (2nd edition:Saint Petersburg:Government Senate, 1815))
- Course in Universal Geography (Saint Petersburg, 1818-1819) (Written for secondary school education)
- Statistics of European States in their Present State (Saint Petersburg, 1830-1831)
- Russian Statistics (Saint Petersburg:Imperial Academy of Science, 1831)
- Geography of the Russian Empire (Saint Petersburg, 1831)

Zyablovskiy also taught forestry and published Introduction to Forestry (Saint Petersburg, 1804). He also wrote Universal Course in History (Saint Petersburg, 1811-1812) and Historical Narrative of the Teacher's Secondary School and the Pedagogical Institute (Saint Petersburg, 1833). He translated Johann Ernst Fabri's General Geography from German (Saint Petersburg, 1807).
