= Nikolai Kudryavtsev =

Soviet petroleum geologist proponent of the abiogenic theory of hydrocarbon origin

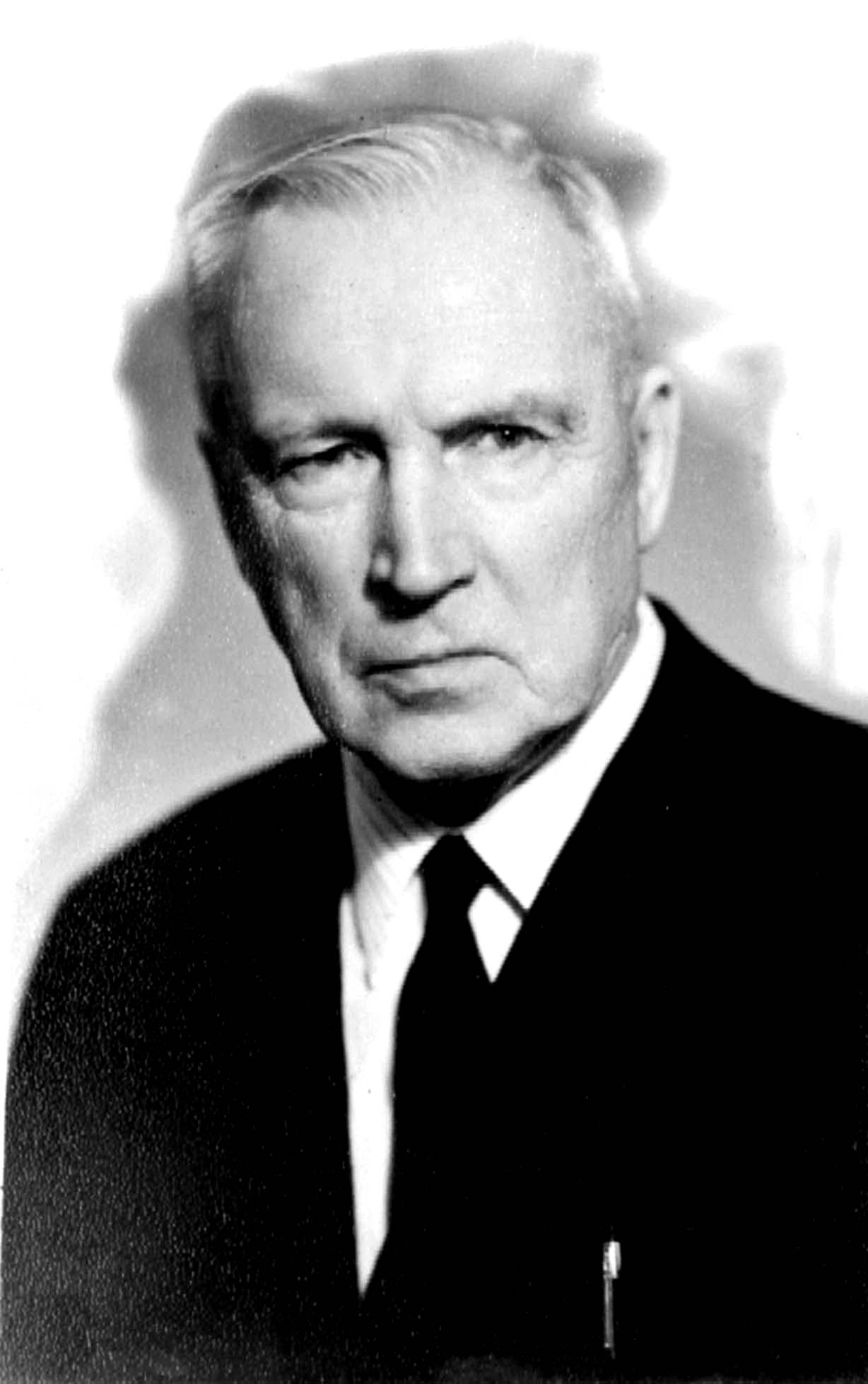
Prof. Nikolai A. Kudryavtsev (1893-1971)

Nikolai Alexandrovich Kudryavtsev (Russian: Николай Александрович Кудрявцев; October 21, 1893, Opochka – December 12, 1971, Leningrad) was a Soviet Russian petroleum geologist. He is the founding father of modern abiogenic theory for the origin of petroleum, which states that some petroleum is formed from non-biological sources of hydrocarbons located deep in the Earth's crust and mantle.

He graduated from Leningrad Mining Institute in 1922, obtained a Dr.Sc. in Geology and Mineralogy in 1936, and became a professor in 1941. Kudryavtsev started his geological career in 1920 at the USSR Geological Committee. In 1929-1971, he worked for the All-Union Geological Research Institute (VNIGRI). His only son died defending the Brest Fortress at the beginning of Nazi aggression against the USSR.

Kudryavtsev conducted regional geological studies that resulted in discoveries of commercial oil and gas in the Grozny district (Chechnya Autonomy), Central Asia, Timan-Pechora, and other regions of the Soviet Union. He led reconnaissance exploration research in Georgia. He compiled the program of key exploration wells in the West Siberia in 1947 that paved the way to the new era of oil and gas production in Russia that started with first gas gusher near Berezovo in 1953.

== Kudryavtsev's rule ==
In support of his abiotic theory, Kudryavtsev stated in 1973 (Genesis of Gas and Oil) that any region in which hydrocarbons are found at one level will also have hydrocarbons in large or small quantities at all levels down to and into the basement rock. Thus, where oil and gas deposits are found, there will often be coal seams above them. Gas is usually the deepest in the pattern, and can alternate with oil. All petroleum deposits have a capstone, which is generally impermeable to the upward migration of hydrocarbons. This capstone leads to the accumulation of the hydrocarbon.

== Abiogenic theory ==
In 1951, Kudryavtsev proposed the modern abiotic hypothesis of petroleum. Nikolai Kudryavtsev was a prominent and forceful advocate of the abiogenic theory. He argued that no petroleum resembling the chemical composition of natural crudes has ever been made from plant material in the laboratory under conditions resembling those in nature.

He gave many examples of substantial and sometimes commercial quantities of petroleum being found in crystalline or metamorphic basements, or in sediments directly overlying those. He cited cases in Kansas, California, western Venezuela, and Morocco. He also pointed out that oil pools in sedimentary strata are often related to fractures in the basement directly below. This is evidenced by the Ghawar supergiant oil field (Saudi Arabia); the Panhandle Field in Kansas (United States), which also produces helium; the Tengiz Field (Kazakhstan); the White Tiger Field (Vietnam); and innumerable others. The Lost Soldier Field in Wyoming has oil pools, he stated, at every horizon of the geological section, from the Cambrian sandstone overlying the basement to the upper Cretaceous deposits. A flow of oil was also obtained from the basement itself. Hydrocarbon gases, he noted, are not rare in igneous and metamorphic rocks of the Canadian Shield. Petroleum in Precambrian gneiss is encountered in wells on the eastern shore of Lake Baikal. Kudryavtsev concluded that commercial accumulations are found where permeable zones are overlaid by impermeable ones. The impermeable layers are layers of quartz cemented with calcium carbonate.

Kudryavtsev introduced several other relevant observations into the argument about the theory of abiogenic petroleum origin.

- Columns of flames have been seen during the eruptions of some volcanoes, sometimes reaching 500 meters in height, such as during the eruption of Mount Marapi in Sumatra in 1932. (There have been several other instances subsequently.)
- The eruptions of mud-volcanoes have liberated such large quantities of methane that even the most prolific gasfield underneath should have been exhausted long ago.
- The quantities of mud deposited in some cases would have required eruptions of much more gas than is known in any gasfield anywhere.
- The water in mud volcanoes in some instances carries such substances as iodine, bromine and boron that could not have been derived from local sediments, and that exceed the concentrations in seawater one hundredfold.
- Mud volcanoes are often associated with lava volcanoes, and the typical relationship is that where they are close, the mud volcanoes emit incombustible gases. In contrast, the ones further away emit methane.
- He knew of the occurrence of oil in basement rocks of the Kola Peninsula, and of the surface seeps of oil in the Siljan Ring formation of central Sweden. He noted, as mentioned above, that the enormous quantities of hydrocarbons in the Athabasca tar sands in Canada would have required vast amounts of source rocks for their generation in the conventional discussion, when in fact no source rocks have been found.

== Selected publications ==
- Kudryavtsev N.A., 1959. Geological proof of the deep origin of Petroleum. Trudy Vsesoyuz. Neftyan. Nauch. Issledovatel Geologoraz Vedoch. Inst. No.132, pp. 242–262 (In Russian)
- Outlook of the West Siberian petroleum potential. Kudryavtsev N.A., Ed. - Moscow and Leningrad, GosGeolIzdat. - 307 p. (in Russian)
- Kudryavtsev N.A., 1951. Against the organic hypothesis of oil origin. Oil Economy Jour. [Neftyanoe khoziaystvo], no. 9. - pp. 17–29 (in Russian)
- Kudryavtsev N.A., 1955. Recent state of the origin of petroleum problem. In: Discussion on the problem of oil origin and migration. - Kiev, Ukrainian SSR Ac. Sci. Publ. - p. 38-89 (in Russian)
- Kudryavtsev N.A., 1959. Oil, gas, and solid bitumens in the igneous and metamorphic rocks. VNIGRI Proc. no. 142. - Leningrad, GosTopTechIzdat Publ. - 278 p. (in Russian)
- Kudryavtsev N.A., 1963. Deep Faults and Oil Deposits. - Leningrad, GosTopTekhIzdat. – 220 p. (in Russian)
- Kudryavtsev N.A., 1964. Factors governing distribution of oil and gas fields in the Earth's crust. In: Petroleum Geology [Geologiya nefti]. Papers of XXII Geological Congress presented by Soviet geologists. - Nedra Press (in Russian)
- Kudryavtsev N.A., 1966. On haloid metasomatism. In: Problems of oil origin. Porfiriev V.B., Ed. - Kiev, Naukova Dumka Publ. - pp. 144–173 (in Russian)
- Kudryavtsev N.A., 1967. Closing speech. In: Proc. Conference on Distribution regularities and formation conditions for oil and gas fields in the West Siberia Plain. - Moscow, Nedra Press. - pp. 246–249. (in Russian)
- Kudryavtsev N.A., 1973. Genesis of oil and gas. - Leningrad, Nedra Press. - 216 p. (in Russian)

== See also ==
- Abiogenic petroleum origin
- Mud volcano
- Mitch Daniels
- Thomas Homer-Dixon
- Mike Hudema
- Emily Hunter
- Andrew Nikiforuk
