= Index of soil-related articles =

This is an index of articles relating to soil.

== A ==
Acid sulfate soil - Acrisol - Active layer - Agricultural soil science - Akadama - Albeluvisols - Alfisols - Alkali soil - Andisols - Angle of repose - Antigo (soil) - Anthrosol - Aridisols - Atriplex - Australian Society of Soil Science Incorporated -

== B ==
Baer's law - Bama (soil) - Barren vegetation - Base-richness - Bay mud - Bearing capacity - Bentonite - Berkshire (soil) - Bevameter - Biochar - Biogeology - Blandford (soil) - Blue goo - Bog - Brickearth - Brown earth - Brown podzolic

== C ==
Calcareous grassland - Calcareous - Calciorthid - Calcisols - Cambisols - Canada Land Inventory - Capacitance probe - Carbon cycle re-balancing - Casa Grande (soil) - Cation-exchange capacity - Cellular confinement - Cecil (soil) - Characterisation of pore space in soil - Charlottetown (soil series) - Chernozem - Clay - Claypan - Cob (material) - Cohesion (geology) - Compressed earth block - Consolidation (soil) - Contour ploughing - Critical state soil mechanics

== D ==
Darcy (unit) - Darcy's law - Darcy–Weisbach equation - Dark earth - Dispersion (geology) - Downer (soil) - Downhill creep - Drainage research - Drilosphere - Drucker–Prager yield criterion - Drummer (soil) - Dry quicksand - Dryland salinity - Duricrust - Durisols - Dynamic compaction

== E ==
Ecological land classification - Ecosystem ecology - Edaphic - Edaphology - Effective stress - Eluvium - Entisol - Environmental impact of irrigation - Erosion - European Soil Bureau Network - European Soil Database - Expansive clay

== F ==
Factors affecting permeability of soils - Fech fech - Fen - Ferrallitisation - Fill dirt - Flatwood - Flownet - Fractal in soil mechanics - Frequency domain sensor - Fresno scraper - Frost heaving - Frost line - Fuller's earth

== G ==
Gelisols - Geosmin - Geotechnical investigation - Gleysol - Gravitational erosion - Groundwater-related subsidence - Guelph soil - Gypcrust - Gypsisols

== H ==
Hardpan - Headland (agriculture) - Hesco bastion - Hilo (soil) - History of soil science - Histosol - Houdek (soil) - Hume (soil) - Humin - Humus - Humus form - Hydraulic conductivity - Hydric soil - Hydro axe mulching - Hydrological transport model - Hydropedology - Hydrophobic soil

== I ==
Immobilization (soil science) - Inceptisols - Infiltration capacity - International Humic Substances Society - International Soil Reference and Information Centre - International Union of Soil Sciences

== J ==
Jory (soil)

== K ==
Kalkaska sand - Kerogen

== L ==
Lahar - Laimosphere - Land improvement - Lateral earth pressure - Leaching (agriculture) - Leaching (pedology) - Leaching model (soil) - Leptosols - Lessivage - Liming (soil) - Linear aeration - Lixisols - Loam - Loess - Lunar soil

== M ==
Martian soil - Miami (soil) - Multi-Scale Soil Information Systems - Mineralization (soil science) - Mollisols - Mud - Multiscale European Soil Information System - Muskeg - Myakka (soil)

== N ==
Narragansett (soil) - Natchez silt loam - National Society of Consulting Soil Scientists - Natural organic matter - Newmark's influence chart - No-till farming

== O ==
On-Grade Mat Foundation for Expansive Soils - OPAL Soil Centre - Orovada (soil) - Orthent - Overburden pressure - Oxisol

== P ==
Paleosol - Particle size (grain size) - Paxton (soil) - Peat - Pedalfer - Pedocal - Pedodiversity - Pedology - Permeability (earth sciences) - Petrichor - Plaggen soil - Plainfield (soil) - Planosol - Plough pan - Podzol - Pore water pressure - Porosity - Port Silt Loam - Prime farmland - Psamment - Pygmy forest

== Q ==
Quick clay - Quicksand

== R ==
Rankers - Red Mediterranean soil - Regosols - Rendzina - Residual Sodium Carbonate Index - Reynolds' dilatancy - Rill - Rock flour

== S ==
SahysMod - Saline seep - Salinity in Australia - Salt marsh - Salting the earth - SaltMod - San Joaquin (soil) - Sand - Sand boil - Sandbag - Scobey (soil) - Seitz (soil) - Serpentine soil - Shear strength (soil) - Shear strength test - Shrub swamp - Silt - Slope stability - Slump - Sodium adsorption ratio - Soil - Soil acidification - Soil amendment - Soil and water assessment tool - Soil Association - Soil biodiversity - Soil biology - Soil carbon - Soil cement - Soil chemistry - Soil classification - Soil compaction - Soil conditioner - Soil conservation - Soil Conservation and Domestic Allotment Act - Soil Conservation and Domestic Allotment Act of 1936 - Soil contamination - Soil crust - Soil depletion - Soil ecology - Soil erosion - Soil fertility - Soil food web - Soil functions - Soil gradation - Soil guideline value - Soil health - Soil horizon - Soil inoculant - Soil life - Soil liquefaction - Soil management - Soil mechanics - Soil moisture - Soil moisture sensors - Soil nailing - Soil organic matter - Soil pH - Soil physics - Soil policy (Victoria, Australia) - Soil profile - Soil resilience - Soil respiration - Soil salinity - Soil salinity control - Soil science - Soil Science Society of America - Soil series - Soil solarization - Soil steam sterilization - Soil structure - Soil survey - Soil test - Soil texture - Soil type - Soil water (retention) - Soils retrogression and degradation - Solonchak - Solonetz - Specific storage - Specific weight - Spodic soils - Stagnosol - Strip farming - Stuttgart (soil) - Subaqueous soil - Subsidence - Subsoil

== T ==
Talik - Tanana (soil) - Technosols - Tepetate - Terrace (agriculture) - Terracette - Terramechanics - Terra preta - Terra rosa (soil) - Terzaghi's principle - Thaw depth - Thixotropy - Threebear (soil) - Throughflow - Tifton (soil) - Tillage - Topsoil - Tropical peat

== U ==
Umbric horizon - Ultisols - Umbrisols - Unified Soil Classification System - USDA soil taxonomy - Ustochrept

== V ==
Vegetation and slope stability - Vertisol - Vibro stone column - Void ratio

== W ==
Water content - Weathering - White-eye (soil) - Windsor (soil) - World Congress of Soil Science

== Y ==
Yedoma

== See also ==
- List of state soil science associations
- List of state soil science licensing boards
- List of U.S. state soils
- List of bogs
- List of vineyard soil types
