= Tokul soil =

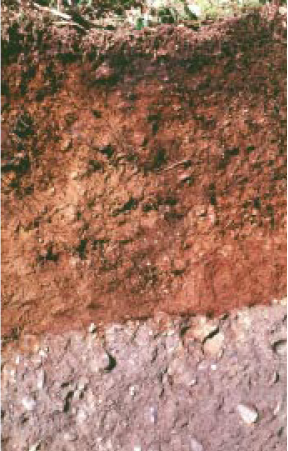
Tokul Soil profile

The Tokul soil series are Andisol soils formed by volcanic ash and loess over a dense glacial till. The soils are found in the Puget lowland forests and western foothills of the Cascade Range, along the Puget Trough, which stretches from south of Seattle to the Canadian border. Tokul soils are the designated state soil of Washington state.

== Name ==
The Tokul soil series is named after Tokul Creek, a small tributary of the Snoqualmie River in eastern King County near Fall City, Washington, draining an area north of Snoqualmie Falls. The name of Tokul Creek itself is derived from the Lushootseed word dəxʷq̓al, the name of a Snoqualmie village on the creek consisting of seven longhouses.

== Profile ==
The Tokul soil series has the following profile:

- Surface layer: organic material
- Subsurface layer: gravelly medial loam
- Subsoil - upper: gravelly medial fine sandy loam
- Subsoil - lower: gravelly sandy loam

Tokul soils have an organic surface, rich in decaying plant matter from the prevalent coniferous forest debris in the area. Below this, a dark-brown, organic rich, gravelly loam creates a fertile and well-drained layer, into which plant roots penetrate. This brown-reddish sub-layer, which extends 1–2 feet (0.30–0.61 m) below the surface, is strongly influenced by volcanic ash and has high concentrations of manganese and iron. Lower still is the grayish, dense glacial till, which then was overlaid with volcanic ash and loess, or wind-blown sediment.

The state has over 1,000,000 acres (4,000 km^{2}) of Tokul soils on the western side of the Cascade mountains. Hundreds of other volcanic soils make up the rest of Washington's soils.

== Plant Habitat ==
Tokul soils are among the most productive in the world, supporting the state's rich coniferous forests, which are dominated by Douglas fir and western hemlock, the state tree of Washington.

During wet periods, moisture builds up above the layer of dense glacial till, which can create unstable steep slopes. The soil series is threatened by displaced top soil as a result of development and agriculture due to lower humus content caused by tilling and digging.

== Washington state soil ==
The Tokul soil series was selected by the Washington Society of Professional Soil Scientists as the official soil of Washington. While the soil series has not yet been officially designated as the state soil by the state legislature, it is recognized by the USDA Natural Resources Conservation Service (NRCS) and many other agricultural and pedological organizations as the designated representative soil of Washington state.

Washington was the first state to recognize an Andisol, or a soil formed in volcanic ash, as the state soil.

== See also ==
- List of U.S. state soils
- Pedology (soil study)
- Soil types
- Puget lowland forests
