= San Joaquin (soil) =

Soil type

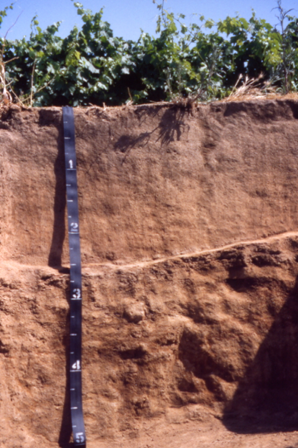
San Joaquin soil profile

San Joaquin soil landscape

San Joaquin is an officially designated state insignia, the state soil of the U.S. state of California.

The California Central Valley has more than 500,000 acres (2,000 km^{2}) of San Joaquin soils, named for the south end of that valley. This series is the oldest continuously recognized soil series within the state. It is one of California's Benchmark Soils, and a soil profile of it is displayed in the International Soil Reference and Information Centre's World Soil Museum.

The San Joaquin series became the official state soil on August 20, 1997, the result of efforts by students and teachers from Martin Luther King, Jr. Middle School in Madera, natural resource professionals, the Professional Soil Scientists Association of California, legislators, and various state universities.

These soils are used for irrigated crops, such as wheat, rice, figs, almonds, oranges, and grapes, and for pasture and urban development. San Joaquin soils formed in old alluvium on hummocky topography. A cemented hardpan a few feet beneath the surface restricts roots and water percolation. San Joaquin soils are classified in USDA soil taxonomy as fine, mixed, active, thermic abruptic durixeralfs.

== Soil profile ==
- Surface layer is brown loam.
- Upper subsoil is brown loam, lower subsoil is brown clay.
- Substratum is light brown and brown, indurated duripan with 70 to 90 percent silica-sesquioxide cementation.

== Legislative history ==
The bill that designated the San Joaquin Soil as the official State Soil of California (SB-389) began its journey through legislative channels of the California State Legislature early in 1997.

The energy that propelled the San Joaquin Soil to being formally designated the "Official State Soil" -- was that of Alex Lehman, who saw an opportunity to provide his Madera, California Martin Luther King, Jr. Middle School students with a meaningful endeavor which allowed an integrated curriculum approach. Mr. Lehman solicited the assistance of a State Senator, the Honorable Dick Monteith, as well as the Professional Soil Scientists Association of California (PSSAC). The concept to designate the San Joaquin Soil as the official soil of California began a number of years ago when Gordon Huntington, and several other PSSAC members suggested that designating an official State Soil would be a worthwhile goal of the association, which conducted research and prepared supporting documentation. Mr. Lehman and his students approached Senator Monteith with PSSAC's documentation, including appropriate maps and soil description. The students had also done their own research on other states already having an official state soil. Senator Monteith was impressed and agreed to assist with the class's project.

SB 389's journey began on February 14, 1997. It passed via amendment in the California State Senate on March 20, 1997 and the California State Assembly on July 21, 1997. From there it went to the California Governor's desk and was signed into California Government Code on August 20, 1997 by Governor Pete Wilson.

== History of recognition ==
The history of recognition and the development of the San Joaquin soil dates from the turn of the 20th century. Field operations of the United States Soil Survey, now known as the National Cooperative Soil Survey, began in 1899. The San Joaquin soil was initially documented and officially established in 1900 as one of the first four soil series recognized in California by the survey. All were considered to have agricultural importance. Since then, three of these series have either been dropped from the official listings or have been combined with other soil series recognized at a later date. Thus, the San Joaquin soil is the oldest, continuously recognized soil series within the state. (More than 1,500 soil series are currently recognized in California.) Nearly one-half million acres (2,000 km^{2}) of this soil have now been identified and mapped in many counties in California. With proper management, this soil has produced many billions of dollars of food wealth for the state's economy. Knowledge of the San Joaquin soil's properties and characteristics has become increasingly important in suburban and urban development. As the science of soil has advanced during this century, the concept of the San Joaquin soil has evolved, but has retained, as distinctive soil characteristics, its reddish soil color and its strongly cemented subsoil hardpan that limits root and water penetration. Aside from the texture and structure of the surface soil, the early descriptions of the San Joaquin soil paid little attention to the physical character of the subsoil above the hardpan. The hardpan was expected to be encountered within a depth of 6 feet. The modern concept recognizes mainly a sandy loam surface soil overlying a finer textured subsoil that has a significant clay increase, at its upper boundary or within some part of the subsoil. The subsoil rests abruptly on a mainly silica-cemented hardpan at depths ranging from 20 to 40 inches. With these features, plus defined ranges of other surface and subsoil properties such as color, soil texture, structure, consistence, pH, organic matter content, and inherent temperature and moisture characteristics, USDA soil taxonomy now places the San Joaquin series in a fine, mixed, thermic family of Abruptic Durixeralfs. The San Joaquin soil was first recognized in the survey of the Fresno Area in 1900.

At that time it was mapped as San Joaquin sandy loam on the "Red Formation" and characterized as being underlain by a "red sandstone hardpan." The soil was described as having a hog wallow (mound and swale) relief. The depth to hardpan ranged from 1 foot to 6 feet. The cementing agent for the hard pan was thought to be ferric hydrate with some lime carbonates and probably silica. About 74,500 acres (301 km^{2}) were mapped. The San Joaquin soil was next mapped in the Modesto-Turlock Area in 1909. and was described as having a "brick red" surface layer that was underlain by a "ferruginous hardpan" at depths of 15 to 60 inches. A red clay loam layer above the hardpan was recognized. About 90,000 acres (360 km^{2}) were mapped. In 1911, the San Joaquin soil was mapped in the Madera Area. The concept of the soil did not change in this survey. It was noted that the soil became saturated during the rainy season and became boggy and impassable except for well traveled roads. About 138,000 acres (558 km^{2}) were mapped.The San Joaquin soil was again mapped in the 1914 update of the Fresno Area.

The concept of the soil did not change significantly from that of the original survey in 1900, but sandy loam and clay loam types were recognized. In addition, an increase in clay content of the subsoil above the hardpan was described in some places. Where the hardpan was less than 30 inches deep, it was noted that it was necessary to fracture the hardpan by blasting to grow fruit trees. There were about 127,000 acres (514 km^{2}) mapped. In the 1915 Reconnaissance Soil Survey of the Sacramento Valley, California by L.C. Holmes, et al., heavier (finer) textures, either clay loams or clays, were described as normally intervening between the surface soil and the hardpan in the San Joaquin soil San Joaquin soils mapped in the Reconnaissance Soil Surveys of the San Joaquin Valley and Southern California in 1915 to 1919 were similarly described. San Joaquin soil identified in Southern California at that time have subsequently been correlated with other similar, but pedologically different soils.

During the 1920s and 1930s nine new soil surveys remapped, in greater detail, much of the area covered earlier by the Reconnaissance Soil Surveys of the San Joaquin and Sacramento Valleys. For the most part, but not entirely, these surveys confined their recognition of San Joaquin soils to those areas of reddish hardpan soils having a clayey subsoil resting on the hardpan. For a period of time, a very similar soil was recognized as the Rocklin series which differed from the San Joaquin series only in having thick, consolidated sediments beneath its hardpan, opposed to looser sediments beneath the San Joaquin hardpan. This was considered to be of practical importance in modifying these soils for deep rooted crops.

By the late 1930s and early 1940s, this concept was dropped and the Rocklin soil redefined as a reddish hardpan soil having a distinct subsoil above its hardpan, but lacking a clay pan. The character of the materials beneath the hardpans of either soil was no longer a differentiating feature since consistent determination in mapping was not feasible. The Soil Manual for the Eleventh Farm Credit District, USDA, dated September 1, 1941, described the following concept of the San Joaquin soil: "As mapped in the past (San Joaquin soil) probably included several series. As presently defined (this soil) occupies old terraces, fans, and valley plains of granitic origin, mainly on the east side of the San Joaquin and Sacramento Valleys. Topography - sloping to undulating with 'hog wallow' microrelief. Reddish brown topsoil over heavier (finer textured) subsoil containing an iron-cemented hardpan. Redder in the surface and denser hardpan than associated Madera soil. Used mostly for pasture and for dry-farmed grain. Some fruit and other crops grown with fair success where irrigated."

Further description of a San Joaquin soil profile was given in the Soil Manual as follows: "The surface soil reported as a reddish brown, gritty sandy loam about 14 inches thick. The subsoil reported as a sticky and very plastic, brownish red sandy clay loam about 10 inches thick resting abruptly on a red or brownish red, indurated hardpan.The oldest official description of the San Joaquin Valley series, filed with the Soil Conservation Service, was dated January 1941, and revised August 1952. The concept was similar to that used by the Eleventh Farm Credit District except that the subsoil was described as a sandy clay with an abrupt upper and lower boundary. This was the first official description that approached the modern concept of the San Joaquin series. Subsequent field and laboratory studies have led to further revisions and to the present concept given in the 1996 series description.In 1983, the type location for the San Joaquin soil was relocated to a site north of Lodi, California, in San Joaquin county. At that time, a monolith (a preserved 5 foot profile section) of the San Joaquin soil was prepared for this site and sent to the Netherlands World Soil Museum in Wageningen, the Netherlands. Previously, the San Joaquin soil had been selected by the Soil Conservation Service as one of California's Benchmark Soils. "Benchmark Soils" is a nationwide listing of soil series considered representative of soils in Major Land Resource Areas (MLRA) in the United States.Modern soil survey maps now show the distribution of San Joaquin Soil of California in Fresno, Madera, Mariposa, Merced, Placer, Sacramento, San Joaquin, Stanislaus, Sutter, Tulare, and Yuba Counties. They are also located in Butte County, by an older soil survey.

== Medical interest ==
Coccidioides immitis resides in the soil here as in much of the southwestern United States and so coccidioidomycosis is endemic. Valley Fever is a common term for this fungal infection caused by C. immitis through the inhalation of airborne dust or dirt.

== See also ==
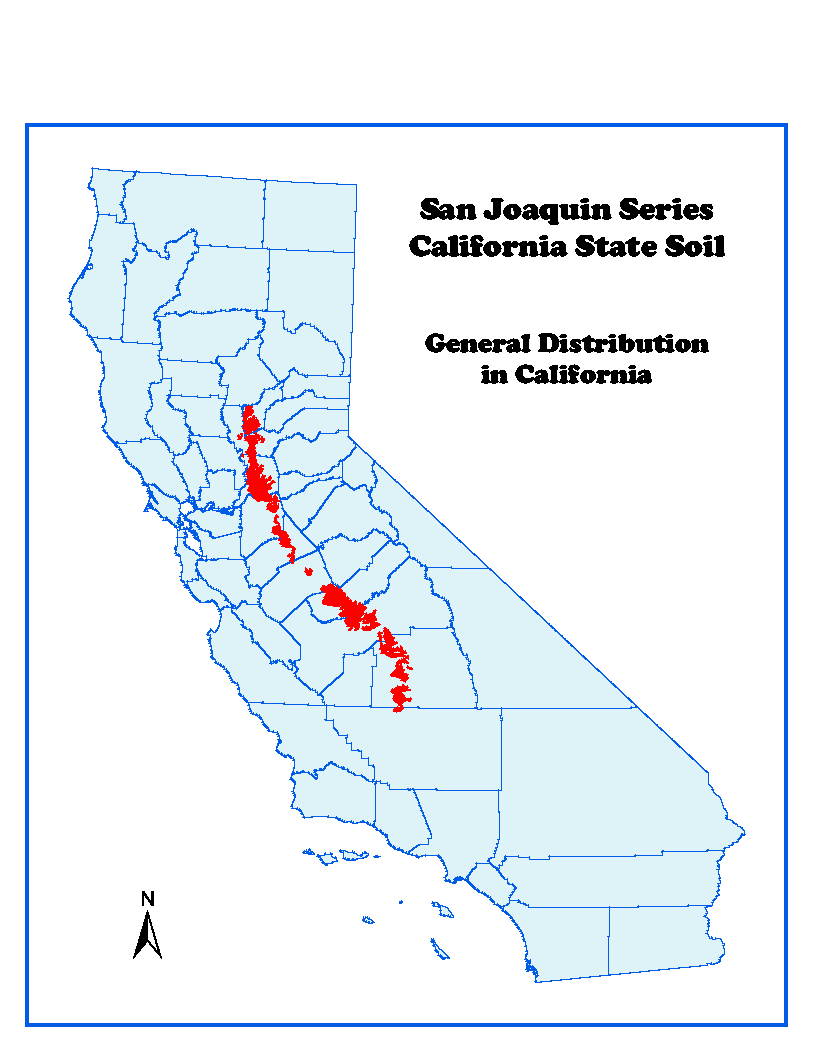
San Joaquin distribution

- Alfisols
- Groundwater-related subsidence
- List of U.S. state soils
- Pedology (soil study)
- Soil types
- List of State Soil Science Associations
