= Jory (soil) =

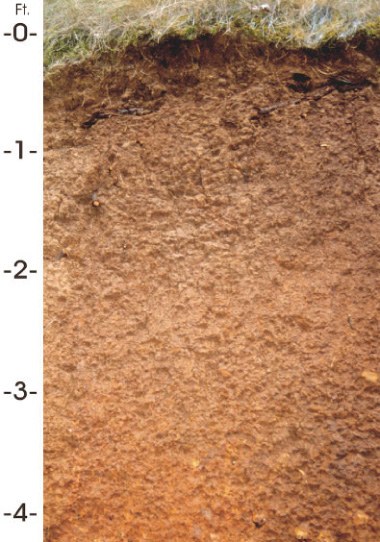
Soil profile

The Jory soil series consists of very deep, well-drained soils that formed in colluvium derived from basic igneous rock. These soils are in the foothills surrounding the Willamette Valley of the United States. They have been mapped on more than 300,000 acres (1,200 km^{2}) in western Oregon. They are named after Jory Hill, Marion County, Oregon, which itself is named for the Jory family, who settled in the area in 1852 after traveling along the Oregon Trail.

- Surface layer: organic material
- Subsurface layer: dark reddish brown silty clay loam
- Subsoil - upper: dark reddish brown clay
- Subsoil - lower: red clay

Jory soils generally support forest vegetation, dominantly Douglas fir and Oregon white oak. They are very productive forest soils. Many areas have been cleared and are used for crops. The Jory soils and the climate of the Willamette Valley provide an ideal setting for the production of many crops, including Christmas trees, various berries, filberts (hazelnuts), sweet corn, wheat, and many varieties of grass seed. The soils are suitable for growing wine grapes and expanding the Oregon wine industry.

The growing urbanization of the Willamette Valley is putting great pressure on development in areas with Jory soils.

== Oregon state soil ==
After several failed attempts to make it an official state symbol, Jory was officially adopted as the state soil of Oregon by the Oregon Legislative Assembly in 2011.

== See also ==
- List of U.S. state soils
- Oak savanna
- Pedology (soil study)
- Soil types
- Willamette Valley (ecoregion)
