= Sassafras (soil) =

Midatlantic US soil series

The Sassafras soil series is one of the oldest in the United States and has great historical significance to modern-day soil science. It was recognized as the state soil of Maryland in 1901 and is now identified as a Benchmark (a soil that has large extent in major resource areas) and Hall of Fame soil series, which is a recognition given to a soil series for having a critical role in the evolution of soil science. It has been mapped in over 500,000 acres around Maryland and is also found in Pennsylvania, New Jersey, Delaware, Virginia, and Washington DC.

== History ==
The historical significance of the Sassafras soil goes back to how soil series are classified. In 1899, the Bureau of Soils was created and early soil scientists, such as J.A. Bonsteel, began mapping out soils to identify and collect data on the soils. Not only was the Sassafras soil series one of the first to be classified in the United States, but it also affected how future soil series would be classified and named.

Initially, soil series were supposed to be named after the texture of the soil; The names would be determined based on if the soil had more clay, silt, or sand. In 1899, the Sassafras soil series was first mapped out in two different areas in Cecil County, Maryland. However, the textures of the two regions were too vastly different. Soil scientists soon discovered the sandy loams in one area were too different from the sandy loams of the other area, so they began naming soils based on geographic landscapes around the area. As a result, the Sassafras soil series was named after a river and a peninsula in the Chesapeake Bay. It is commonly misunderstood that this soil series is named after the Sassafras tree, and from this misunderstanding, there is a current rule that soil series cannot be named after plants. Since the discovery of soil profiles in the early 1920s, soil scientists have stopped naming soil series based on geographic landscapes.

== Soil formation ==
Soil is formed through five factors, together known as CLORPT, or climate, organisms, relief, parent material, and time.

- Sassafras requires lots of rainfall with moderate temperatures in addition to a humid and warm climate. This particular climate allows the soil to leach, or remove/ dissolve essential nutrients from the top of the soil to the bottom.
- As a result of developing in forests, much of the organisms associated with the formation of Sassafras includes leaves, roots, and other plant remains from the forests. While these organisms could create organic matter on the topsoil, they could break down quickly from other animal activity or from the rain.
- The relief of a soil refers to the landscape, position, and shape of the environment such as if the landscape is hilly, in mountains, facing the sun, etc. Sassafras is generally formed at higher locations of the landscape so is able to drain well as gravity moves water from the top, where Sassafras is, to the bottom of the landscape.
- The Coastal Plain, or flat land near the sea, is the parent material of Sassafras. The sediments and other minerals of the Coastal Plain traveled via moving water (alluvial processes) and mixed with sandy marine sediments which created Sassafras soil.
- Time varies when creating soil, especially depending on the other factors such as climate. Since Sassafras is in a humid climate, it requires less time to form when compared to other soils formed in cold climates.

== Characteristics ==
Soil Profile of Sassafras

A generic soil profile for a soil.

- Horizon A (Topsoil)- Brown sandy loam: The topsoil is a bit sticky, has a fine-sized subangular blocky structure, has few roots in the soil, and can be acidic.
- Horizon B (Upper Subsoil)- Brown sandy clay loam: The upper subsoil is much like the topsoil and has few roots, can be acidic, but has a more medium blocky structure rather than the small size of the topsoil.
- Horizon B (Lower Subsoil)- Brown sandy loam: The lower subsoil horizon generally has a weak, blocky structure and is more acidic than the horizons above it.
- Horizon C (Parent Material)- Yellow and brown loamy sand: The parent material has loose, non-sticky sands which can accumulate iron that turns the sand red or yellow colors. This horizon is extremely acidic, and the parent material originates from fluviomarine sediments, or sediments that come from the sea.

== Uses of Sassafras soil ==
The Sassafras soil series is well-drained, super-deep soil that creates many uses for both humans and the environment. In addition to supporting forests with large trees such as hickories and oaks, Sassafras is also used in pastures and used to grow fruits and a variety of crops like asparagus and barley. Because of its wide range of uses, many animals thrive off the soil. Deer and other forest animals live in the vast forests the soil produces, and horses and other cattle love the pasture Sassafras provides. Another important use is the clean water that the Sassafras creates as it filters through the soil- this clean water drains into the Chesapeake Bay, which provides an essential resource for the wildlife in the Bay. Because of the clean water, animals like oysters and crabs living in the Bay can thrive here due to the soil.

While Sassafras soil is critical for wildlife, people have also used it for their benefit. For instance, it is an excellent resource for farming, creating large recreational fields, camping grounds, roads, and buildings. It is used for so many things because it has few limitations. One limitation is Sassafras's sandy texture causes a risk of the soil caving in when people work with it. Another limitation is that the subsoils infiltrate liquid slowly, causing issues if people want instant results instead of waiting for the soil to drain.

== See also ==
- List of U.S. state soils
- Pedology (soil study)
