= Houdek (soil) =

Type of soil composed of glacial till and decomposed organic matter

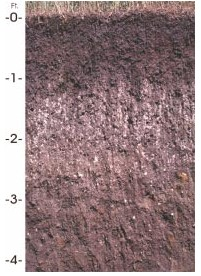
A 4-foot (1.2 m) cross section of Houdek loam

Houdek is a type of soil composed of glacial till and decomposed organic matter. The soil series was established in 1955 in Spink County, South Dakota. It is unique to the United States, but in particular to South Dakota where it is the state soil.

Surface layer
Dark grayish brown loam
Subsoil - upper
Dark grayish brown clay loam
Subsoil - middle
Grayish brown clay loam
Subsoil - lower
Light olive brown clay loam
Substratum
Light yellowish brown clay loam

== South Dakota State Soil ==
The soil forming factors provide a unique landscape in South Dakota which gives rise to more than 550 different soils. The Houdek soil was designated as the South Dakota State Soil in 1990, by Governor George Mickelson of the State Legislature. The House Bill was signed into law, making the Houdek loam South Dakota's Official State Soil.

This soil and others in the same location have been mapped on about 600,000 acres. The Professional Soil Scientists Association of SD and the SD Chapter of the Soil and Water Conservation Society worked together to commemorate the importance of soil to South Dakota. It is appropriate that Houdek loam was adopted as the state soil to bring acknowledgement to the important role it has played in South Dakota's most important industry, agriculture.

== Classification and Genesis ==
Houdek topsoil is composed of weathered glacial till and 2% to 4% organic matter which gives it a deep, dark color. The slopes ranges from 0 to 25 percent depending on location. The subsoil consists of layers of clay and lime accumulations that were carried downward from the surface by water. Below these layers is the parent material called glacial till. The family name is fine-loamy, mixed, superactive, mesic Typic Argiustoll.

The Houdek soil series is deep, well drained, loamy soil that represents many soils formed in South Dakota under grass vegetation. The dark color of the surface layer is a result of decomposition of biomass from vegetation and other materials that have been deposited over thousands of years. Prairie conditions form a thick, dark colored, humified surface horizon or layer that is humus rich (1 to 4% organic C). This is a key characteristic that makes these soils fertile.

Characteristics: The depth to carbonates ranges from 14 to 24 inches. Thickness of the mollic epipedon ranges from 8 to 20 inches and includes all or part of the Bt horizon. The soil contains 0 to 10 percent by volume of coarse fragments as pebbles. Some pedons contain up to 20 percent by volume of stones throughout.

The A horizon has hue of 10YR, value of 3 to 5 and 2 or 3 moist, and chroma of 1 or 2. It typically is loam or silt loam but is clay loam in some pedons. It is slightly acid or neutral.

1) Clay accumulation layer

The Bt horizon has hue of 10YR or 2.5Y, value of 4 to 6 and 3 to 5 moist, and chroma of 2 or 3. It is clay loam averaging between 27 and 35 percent clay. Some pedons have thin horizons that exceed 35 percent clay. It is neutral or slightly alkaline.

2) Lime accumulation layer. As the Houdek soils weathered and formed, water from the soil surface carried lime and clay downward. These materials were deposited deeper, forming the two subsoil layers.

The Bk horizon has hue of 10YR or 2.5Y, value of 4 to 6 and 4 or 5 moist, and chroma of 2 to 4. It is clay loam or loam and is slightly or moderately alkaline. It contains few to many, fine or medium accumulations of carbonate.

The last layer in the Houdek soil is the parent material. This layer represents the materials from which the Houdek soil has developed with time. It represents what the glacier originally left at the soil surface. Climate factors and vegetation/soil organisms have weathered the glacial parent materials to form the present day Houdek soil.

The C horizon has hue of 10YR, 2.5Y, or 5Y, value of 5 to 7 and 4 to 6, and chroma of 2 to 4. It is loam or clay loam and is slightly or moderately alkaline. It has few to many mottles inherent to the parent till. It has few or common accumulations of gypsum between depths of 40 and 60 inches in most pedons.

The classic Houdek soil profile includes: a 6-8 inch friable, neutral, black loam topsoil; a 10 to 15 inch friable, neutral, dark brown clay loam subsoil; a 15 to 30 inch friable, calcareous, moderately alkaline, olive brown clay loam subsoil; and 20+ inches of friable, light olive brown, calcareous, moderately alkaline clay loam parent material.

== Geomorphology ==
The Pleistocene (1.5 - 10,000 B.C.) in Northern America was tilled by a succession of great ice sheets. The area covered by glaciers in North America is estimated at 10.4 million km^{2} and about 20% of the U.S. is influenced by the deposits. The retreating glaciers created the unconsolidated rock surface east of the Missouri River. It took the sediment numerous glacial advances and retreats beginning some 1.5 million years ago, and ending 10 thousand years ago to create glacial tilled soils. Eastern South Dakota has a thick layer of glacial sediment that is about 100 feet (30 meters). The glacial till is a result of the material deposited directly by the ice. The mixture of rock has a diverse range of particle size.

== Climate and Vegetation ==
The average annual air temperature is about 48 degrees F and the average annual precipitation is 22 inches. Due to its high storage of water that is plant available no irrigation is needed during the growing season to sustain at least three months of perennial grasses ranging from tall, mid, or short species. The amount of precipitation is sufficient to provide good production of organic residues but not enough to cause severe weathering and leaching. The climate and vegetation have interacted in South Dakota to produce seven major soil regions. These regions are named: Cool Moist Forest; Cool, Very Dry Plain; Warm, Very Dry Plain; Cool Dry Plain; Warm Dry Plain; Cool Moist Prairie; and Warm Moist Prairie.

Houdek soils are recognized for their uses for cropland and rangeland. Common crops grown are small grains, sunflowers, corn and soybeans are commonly grown crops. Livestock graze pastures of Alfalfa and other native grasses. Large areas of Houdek soils are also composed of native range. Crops and grasses grown on the Houdek soil also provide habitat for wildlife. Some native vegetation consist of big bluestem, little bluestem, western wheatgrass, green needlegrass, needle and thread, sideoats grama, blue grama, sedges, and forbs.

== Economic Importance ==
The Houdek soil is of major economic importance to South Dakota because it is often used as to grow small grain, corn, sunflowers, and soybeans. South Dakota is well known as an agricultural state with an area of 77, 047 square miles and it has a population density of nine persons per square mile. Cash receipts from farming and ranching normally exceeds $3 billion each year. On the average, South Dakota is recognized nationally in the top ten for corn, soybeans, spring wheat, oat, alfalfa hay, all hay, grain sorghum, sunflower seed, barley, rye, and flaxseed production. With such soil fertile soil comes premium forage for livestock which is why South Dakota also comes in top ten for beef, sheep, hog, and honey production. Houdek loam soil is the foundation of life and the economic base for South Dakota. Houdek loam is a symbol that can help increase public awareness and importance of South Dakota's soil resources.

== See also ==
- Pedology (soil study)
- Soil types
- List of U.S. state soils

== Bibliography ==
- "Houdek – South Dakota State Soil" (PDF). U.S. Dept. of Agriculture, National Resources Conservation Service (FTP). (To view documents see Help:FTP)
- "Houdek Loam: THE STATE SOIL of SOUTH DAKOTA." PSSASD. The Professional Soil Scientists Association of South Dakota and the South Dakota Chapter of the Soil and Water Conservation Society, 1 Dec. 2002. Web. 21 Nov. 2015. <http://www.pssasd.org/>.
- "Houdek Series." National Cooperative Soil Survey, 1 Feb. 1997. Web. 21 Nov. 2015. <https://soilseries.sc.egov.usda.gov/OSD_Docs/H/HOUDEK.html>
- Johnson, Warren, James Kirk, Kenneth Miller, and Grayson Murphy. "Soil Survey Davison County, South Dakota." United States Department of Agriculture, Soil Conservation Service, South Dakota Agricultural Experiment Station, 1974. Web. 21 Nov. 2015.
- Grunwald, Sabine. “Primary Mineral Components of Soils”. Retrieved December 13, 2015, from https://soils.ifas.ufl.edu/faculty/grunwald/teaching/eSoilScience/primary.shtml
- Malo, Douglas. "Soils of South Dakota." The Northern State University CUEST Center for Environmental Education, Aberdeen, SD., 1997. Web. 21 Nov. 2015. <http://www3.northern.edu/natsource/EARTH/Sdsoil1.html%5B%5D>.
- Malo, Douglas, Jin-Hee Ryu, Si-Joo Kim, and Doug-Young Chung. "South Dakota Soils: Their Genesis, Classification, and Management." CNU Journal of Agricultural Science Vol. 37.No.3 (2010): pp. 413–433. Print.
- "Soil Web." Web. 21 Nov. 2015. <http://casoilresource.lawr.ucdavis.edu/soil_web/ssurgo.php?action=explain_component&mukey=354794&cokey=10882161#WLF>
- "South Dakota Soil Classification Key." Agricultural Experiment Station at South Dakota State University, Natural Resources Conservation Service, 1 Sept. 2003. Web. 21 Nov. 2015. <http://pubstorage.sdstate.edu/AgBio_Publications/articles/TB96.pdf>.
