= Tifton (soil) =

Tifton soil is the official state soil of the state of Georgia.

== Profile ==
A typical Tifton soil profile consists of an 11 inches (280 mm) topsoil of dark grayish brown loamy sand. The subsoil extends to about 65 inches, strong brown fine sandy loam to 22 inches; yellowish brown sandy clay loam to 40 inches; yellowish brown mottled, sandy clay loam to 60 inches, and strong brown, mottled sandy clay to 65 inches. Two distinctive features of the Tifton soil profile are the presence of more than 5 percent ironstone nodules in the upper part of the soil and more than 5 percent plinthite in the lower part of the soil.

Tifton soils are on nearly level to gently sloping uplands of the Southern Coastal Plain. They formed in loamy sediments of marine origin. When this series was identified in 1909 it was recognized as one of the best soils for cotton, which at the time was a most important cash crop. At present, Tifton soils are among the most agriculturally important soils in the state. Twenty-seven percent of Georgia's prime farmland is on Tifton soils, more than twice as much as any other soil series. Cotton, peanuts, soybeans, and corn are the principal crops grown on these soils.

Although primarily an agricultural soil, the Tifton is also a good forest soil with only slight erosion hazard, equipment limitations, and seedling mortality. Loblolly pine and slash pine are the two main plantation species; some longleaf pine is also seen.

== See also ==
- Pedology (soil study)
- Soil types
- List of U.S. state soils
