= Bama (soil) =

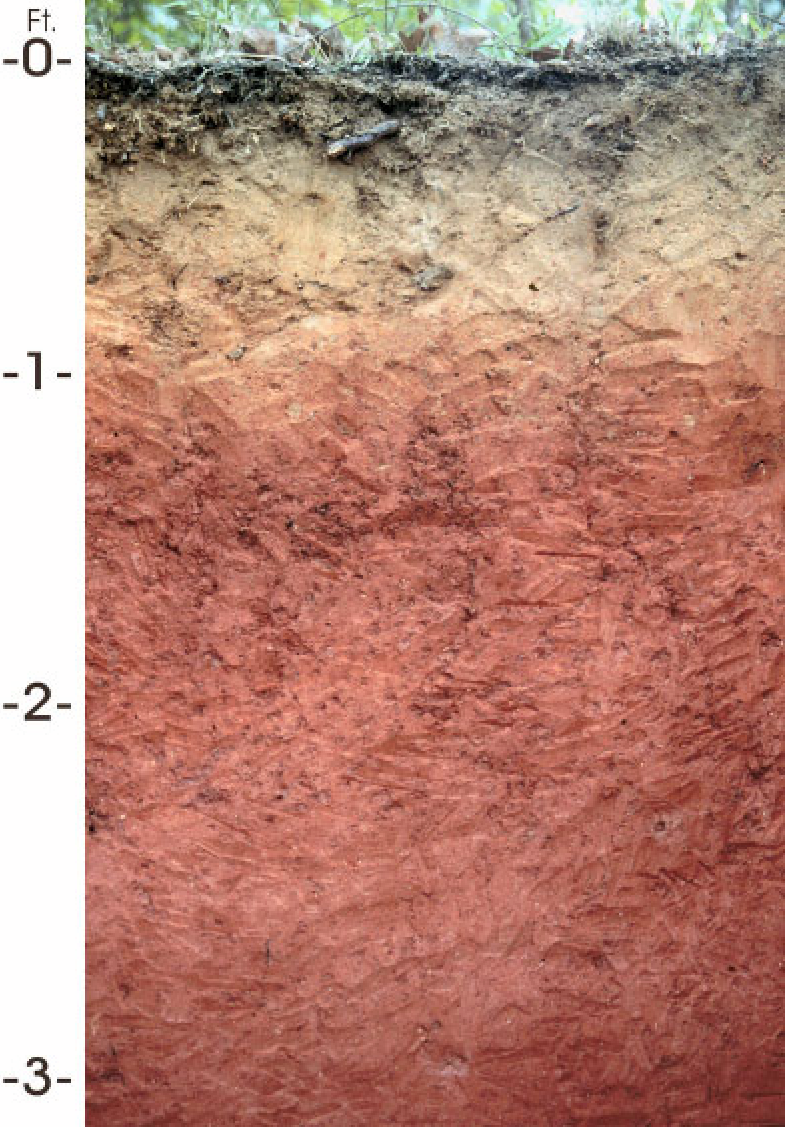
Bama soil profile. Surface layer is dark brown fine sandy loam. Subsurface layer is pale brown fine sandy loam. Subsoil is red clay loam and sandy clay loam

Bama is the official state soil of Alabama.

The Professional Soil Classifiers Association of Alabama adopted a resolution at its 1996 annual meeting recommending the Bama Soil Series as the state soil. The association is of a group of soil classifiers representing the Alabama Cooperative Extension System, the Alabama Agricultural Experiment Station, the USDA-Natural Resources Conservation Service, the Alabama A&M University, private soil consultants, the Board of Registration for Professional Soil Classifiers, and the Alabama Department of Public Health. The Alabama Soil and Water Conservation Committee and the Alabama Association of Conservation Districts also joined in recommending the Bama Soil Series as the official State Soil. The Bama series was designated the official state soil by the Alabama Legislature on April 22, 1997.

Bama soils are mainly in level to gently sloping areas on high stream terraces paralleling major river systems and on broad marine terraces. These very deep, well-drained, moderately permeable soils formed in thick deposits of loamy fluvial or marine sediments. These soils make up more than 360,000 acres (1,500 km^{2}), mainly in the western and central parts of Alabama. They occur in 26 counties. These soils are well suited to cultivated crops, pasture, hay, woodland, and most urban land uses. Cotton and corn are the main cultivated crops.

Bama soils are classified in USDA soil taxonomy as fine-loamy, siliceous, subactive, thermic Typic Paleudults.

== See also ==
- List of U.S. state soils
- Ultisols
- Pedology (soil study)
- Soil types
