= Miami (soil) =

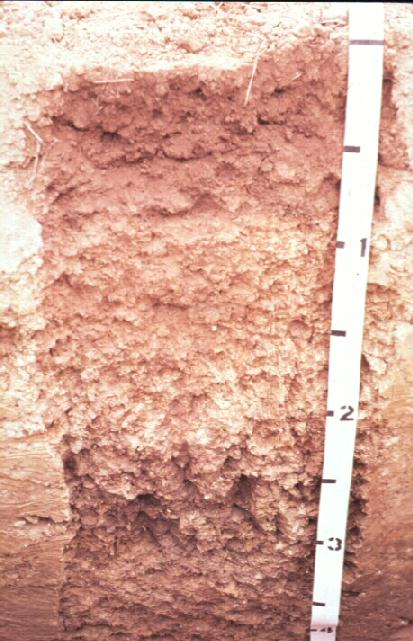
Miami soil profile

The Miami soil series is the state soil of Indiana.

The less sloping Miami soils are used mainly for corn, soybeans, or winter wheat. The steeper areas are used as pasture, hayland, or woodland. Significant area has been converted to residential and commercial uses. There are 794,994 acres (3,217 km^{2}) of Miami soils mapped in Indiana.

Miami soils formed in calcareous, loamy till on the Wisconsin Till Plains. The native vegetation is hardwood forest. Miami soils are fertile and have a moderate available water capacity. Indiana is nationally ranked for agricultural production because of the highly productive Miami soils along with other prime farmland soils in the State.

The Miami series consists of moderately well drained soils formed in as much as 18 inches (46 cm) of loess or silty material and in the underlying loamy till on till plains. They are very deep soils that are moderately deep to dense till. Permeability is moderate or moderately slow in the solum and slow or very slow in the underlying dense till. Slope ranges from 0 to 60%. Mean annual precipitation is 40 inches (1000 mm), and mean annual temperature is 52 °F (11 °C).

Miami soils are classified in USDA soil taxonomy as fine-loamy, mixed, active, mesic Oxyaquic Hapludalfs.

== See also ==
- Alfisols
- Udic moisture regime
- Pedology (soil study)
- Soil types
- List of U.S. state soils
