= Houston black (soil) =

Houston black soil extends over 1,500,000 acres (6,100 km^{2}) of the Texas blackland prairies and is the Texas state soil. The series is composed of expansive clays and is considered one of the classic vertisols.

Houston black soils are used extensively for grain sorghum, cotton, corn, small grain, and forage grasses. In their natural state, they support mostly tall and mid grass prairies of big bluestem (Andropogon gerardi), sideoats grama (Bouteloua curtipendula), switchgrass (Panicum virgatum), little bluestem (Schizachyrium scoparium), and indiangrass (Sorghastrum nutans), with some elm (Ulmus spp.), hackberry (Celtis spp.) and mesquite (Prosopis glandulosa) trees. The soil also shrinks and swells with variations in how much water it contains. In the USDA taxonomic system it is designated an "Udic Haplusterts".

== See also ==
- Pedology (soil study)
- Soil types
- List of U.S. state soils
