= Hilo (soil) =

Soil formed in layers of volcanic ash in Hawaii

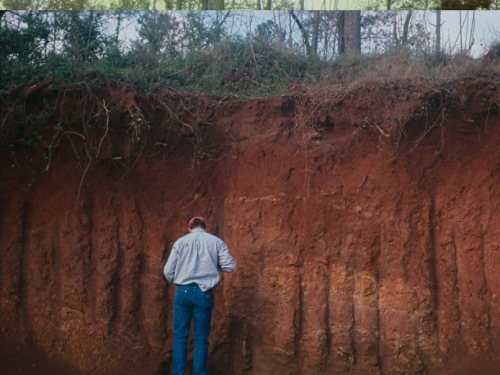
- Hilo soil profile, Summer 2009

lnceptisols
- Parent material: Volcanic ash
- Climate: Hamakua coast, Hawaii
- pH: 5.5

Hilo soil is the official state soil of the state of Hawaii. These soils cover about 21,000 acres (85 km^{2}) and are considered prime agricultural land. The Hawaiian definition of the word “Hilo” is “first night after the new moon.” Also, the word is the Polynesian term for “Navigator,” and the name of a town, Hilo, Hawaii.

== Profile ==
The Hilo soil series consists of very deep, moderately well drained soils that formed in many layers of volcanic ash with lesser amounts of dust from the deserts of central Asia. These dust layers are noticeable because their gray color contrasts with the dark brown and dark reddish brown subsoil formed in volcanic ash. There are several buried layers within the Hilo soil profile. Hilo soils occur on the uplands of the Mauna Kea volcano along the Hāmākua Coast on the island of Hawaii.

== See also ==
- Pedology (soil study)
- Soil types
- List of U.S. state soils
