= Greenwich (soil) =

Greenwich is the unofficial state soil of Delaware. According to the Natural Resources Conservation Service, "The Greenwich series consists of very deep, well-drained, moderately rapidly permeable soils that formed in sandy marine and old alluvial sediments overlain by a thin mantle of sediments that have a high content of silt."

== See also ==
- Pedology
- Soil types
- List of U.S. state soils
