= Drummer (soil) =

Soil in Illinois, United States

Drummer soil
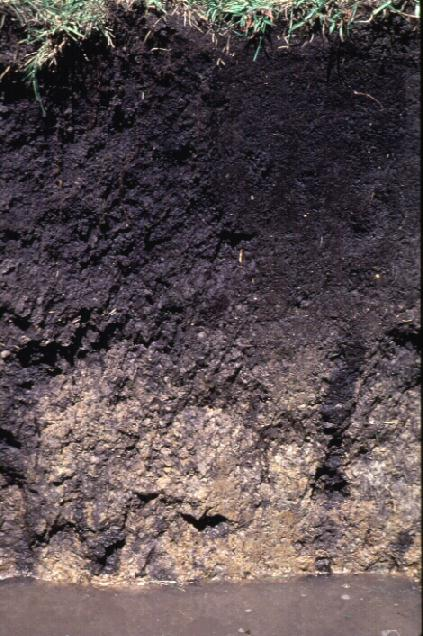
- Drummer soil

Endoaquoll

The Drummer soil series is the state soil of Illinois.

It was established in Ford County, Illinois, in 1929. Drummer Soil was named for Drummer Creek in Drummer Township. It consists of very deep, poorly drained soils that formed in 40 to 60 inches (1.5 m) of loess or other silty material and in the underlying stratified, loamy glacial drift. These soils formed under prairie vegetation.

Drummer soil is the most abundant and extensive soil in Illinois. It occurs over more than 1,500,000 acres (6,100 km^{2}) in the state. It is the most productive soil in the state. Corn and soybeans are the principal crops grown in Drummer soil.

The average annual precipitation in areas of Drummer soil ranges from 32 to 40 inches (1,000 mm). The average annual air temperature ranges from 48 to 54 °F (12 °C).

Drummer is a fine-silty, mixed, superactive, mesic Typic Endoaquoll. This taxonomic classification is characteristic of the wet, dark-colored, prairie-derived soils of Illinois.

== See also ==
- Pedology (soil study)
- Soil types
- List of U.S. state soils
