= Seitz (soil) =

Seitz soil type

The Seitz is the unofficial state soil of Colorado.

== Profile ==
The Seitz soil series consists of very deep, well drained, slowly permeable soils that formed in colluvium or slope alluvium derived from igneous, sedimentary, and volcanic rocks. Seitz soils are located on mountains, mainly in southwestern and central Colorado. These soils are well suited to outdoor recreation and the growth of forest-related products in moderately steep or more gently sloping areas.

== Plant habitat ==
The plant life that grows on the Seitz soil consists of an Engelmann spruce/subalpine fir or Rocky Mountain Douglas-fir canopy with a sparse understory of grasses, forbs, and shrubs.

== See also ==
- Pedology (soil study)
- Soil types
- List of U.S. state soils
