= Scobey (soil) =

Scobey soil
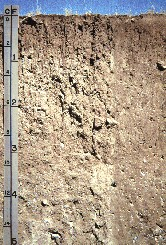
- Scobey soil

Scobey soil is the state soil of Montana. It is named for the town of Scobey, and although Scobey is in far northeast Montana, the soil type is found in the Golden Triangle of North-Central Montana, bounded by Great Falls, Havre, and Shelby, along the Interstate 15, US 87, and US 2 corridors.

Scobey soil consists of very deep, well drained soils on till plains, hills, and moraines. It is known for its productivity for farming wheat. Former Montana Governor Brian Schweitzer wrote his master's dissertation on Scobey soil series in which he found that, at the same site, wheat planted on Scobey soil plots consistently produced higher yields than wheat grown on Kevin soil series plots.

== See also ==
- Pedology (soil study)
- List of U.S. state soils
