= Natchez silt loam =

Natchez silt loam is the official state soil of Mississippi. In 1988, the Professional Soil Classifiers Association of Mississippi selected it to represent the soil resources of the state. These soils exist on 171,559 acres (69,427 ha) (0.56% of state) of landscape in Mississippi.

== Mississippi state soil ==
The Natchez Silt Loam as the official state soil, designated by the Mississippi Legislature in 2003.

== Description ==
The Natchez soils formed in very deep loess material under a woodland environment and a climate that was warm and humid. These soils have natural fertility and desirable tilth but usually occur on slopes that limit their use to trees. In areas where slopes are less, pasture and row crops are grown and the soil is very productive when good management is applied.

A typical Natchez soil profile consists of a 3-inch (7.6 cm) top soil of dark grayish brown silt loam and to 8 inches (20 cm), a subsurface of brown silt loam, a yellowish brown and dark yellowish brown silt loam subsoil to 36 inches (91 cm) and a substratum that is yellowish brown, and dark yellowish brown silt loam down to 80 inches (200 cm).

== Soil family classification ==
Classified as coarse-silty, mixed, superactive, thermic typic eutrudepts:

Natchez soils are in the Inceptisols soil order. Inceptisols soils have developed in relatively young material that have an Ochric epipedon is rich in weatherable minerals. The term coarse-silty indicates that the subsoil has less than 18 percent clay with less than 15 percent sand coarser than very fine. The term mixed suggests that no one mineral is over 60 percent. Thermic refers to an average annual soil temperature between 15 and 22 °C (59 and 72 °F) and differs more than 5 °C (41 °F) between winter and summer at 20 in (50 cm) below the surface.

Natchez soils are on strongly sloping to very steep hillsides in the highly dissected parts of the bluff hills that border the Mississippi Delta floodplains. They formed in silty loess material that ranges from strongly acid to neutral in the upper part and neutral to slightly alkaline in lower parts. Average annual precipitation is 52 inches (1,300 mm). Average annual air temperature is 17 °C (63 °F). The soil has developed in the upper Pleistocene age material.

== See also ==
- List of U.S. state soils
- Soil type

== Sources ==
- This article utilizes text taken verbatim from Natchez Silt Loam- Mississippi State Soil, a public domain publication of the United States Department of Agriculture.
