= White-eye (disambiguation) =

White-eye is a family of small passerine birds.

White-eye may also refer to:

- White-eye (fish), a species of killfish
- White-eye (soil), a type of silty or loamy soil
- White-eye, Subgenus Nyroca of Aythya
- White (mutation), or white-eye mutation, a sex-linked fruit fly mutation
- White-Eye, a lioness in the documentary TV series Big Cat Diary

== See also ==
- Griefer, a disruptive player of MMORPGs in Taiwan, known as "white-eyed"
- White Eyes (disambiguation)
