= Stuttgart (disambiguation) =

Stuttgart is a city in Germany, capital of the state Baden-Württemberg.

Stuttgart may also refer to:

== Places ==
- Stuttgart (region), an administration district (Regierungsbezirk) in Germany
- Stuttgart Region, a region around Stuttgart
- Stuttgart, Arkansas, United States
- Stuttgart, Kansas, United States

== Other uses ==
- Stuttgart (soil), a type of soil in the United States
- VfB Stuttgart football club
- Stuttgart Observatory, astronomical observatory
- SMS Stuttgart, German Königsberg-class light cruiser
