= White Eyes (disambiguation) =

White Eyes (c.1730–1778) was a Native American leader and American Revolution figure.

White Eyes may also refer to:

- White Eyes (album), by Magic, 2003
- "White Eyes", a song by the Wombats from Beautiful People Will Ruin Your Life, 2018
- White Eyes Creek, a stream in Ohio, US
- White Eyes Township, Coshocton County, Ohio, US

== See also ==
- White-eye (disambiguation)
