= Casa Grande (soil) =

Soil type

The Casa Grande is the official state soil of Arizona.

== Name and origin ==
The Casa Grande series was first identified in 1936. It is named after the city of Casa Grande and the nearby Casa Grande National Monument, home of a large earthen building constructed by the Hohokam nearly 1,000 years ago. The Spanish words “Casa Grande” mean “Big House.” The Native Americans used irrigation to remove excess salts from Casa Grande soils and raised cotton, grain, and vegetables on these productive soils, much as farmers do today.

== Profile ==
The Casa Grande series consists of very deep, well-drained, saline-sodic soils on fan terraces and relict basin floors. These soils formed in alluvium derived from granite, rhyolite, andesite, quartzite, and some limestone and basalt. Slopes generally are 0 to 5 percent. The climate is hot and arid.

== Taxonomic Components ==
Series: Casa Grande

Family: fine-loamy, super-active, hyperthermic

Subgroup: Typic Natrargids

Great group: Natrargids

Suborder: Argids

Order: Aridisols

== See also ==
- Pedology (soil study)
- Soil types
- List of U.S. state soils
