= Threebear (soil) =

State soil of Idaho

Threebear soil is the official state soil of the U.S. state of Idaho.

== Profile ==
The Threebear series consists of moderately well drained soils formed in silty sediments with a thick mantle of volcanic ash. These soils are moderately deep to a fragipan. The name “Threebear” is derived from a creek in Latah County, Idaho. These soils are on hills with slopes of 5 to 35 percent.

Threebear soils are used mainly for timber production and wildlife habitat. The potential natural vegetation is western redcedar, grand fir, Douglas-fir, western larch, and western white pine. The average annual precipitation is about 36 inches (900 mm), and the average annual temperature is about 42 °F (6 °C).

== See also ==
- Pedology (soil study)
- Soil types
- List of U.S. state soils
