= Kalkaska sand =

Soil type

Kalkaska sand is the official state soil of the U.S. state of Michigan.

Kalkaska sand was identified in 1927 and named after Kalkaska County located in the northern Lower Peninsula of Michigan. This soil is a multi-layer soil composed of humus, light sand, dark sand, and yellowish sand. It is classified as a spodosol. The distinctive sand layers can range from black to yellowish-brown and are commonly 2 to 4 feet (0.6 to 1.2 m) deep. Kalkaska sand is well-drained and effectively filters water. This makes it a valuable asset in forestry and certain types of agriculture. It is also largely responsible for the remarkable water quality of lakes and rivers located in areas of the state where these soils are abundant.

Kalkaska sand is one of more than 500 soils found in Michigan. Unique to the state, Kalkaska Sand covers nearly 1 million acres (4,000 km^{2}) in 29 Upper and Lower Peninsula counties. It was designated as the state soil of Michigan in 1990.

Kalkaska soils are classified in USDA soil taxonomy as sandy, isotic, frigid Typic Haplorthods.

== See also ==
- Pedology (soil study)
- Soil types
- List of U.S. state soils
