= Downer (soil) =

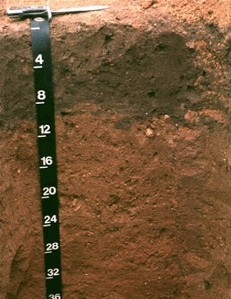
- Downer Soil Horizon

Downer is the New Jersey state soil. The Downer has four soil horizons:

- Surface layer: dark grayish brown loamy sand
- Subsurface layer: grayish brown sandy loam
- Subsoil - upper: yellowish brown gravelly sandy loam
- Subsoil - lower: yellowish brown sand and coarse sand

The Downer Series was established in 1960 in Gloucester County. Downer soils are formed in fluviomarine deposits in the Northern Atlantic Coastal Plains.

== See also ==
- Pedology (soil study)
- List of U.S. state soils
