= Francis D. Hole =

American pedologist

F. D. Hole
- c.1988
- Born: Francis Doan Hole; August 25, 1913; Muncie, Indiana, USA
- Died: January 15, 2002 (aged 88); Madison, WI, USA
- Citizenship: United States
- Education: Earlham College (1933); Haverford College (1934); University of Wisconsin-Madison (1943)
- Known for: Wisconsin State Soil (1983); Soils of Wisconsin (1976); Antigo Silt Loam Song (1980)
- Spouse: Agnes Calvert (m. 1941)
- Children: 2
- Awards: UW-Madison Distinguished Teaching Award (1974)
- Scientific career
- Fields: Soil Science, Pedology, Geography
- Workplaces: Earlham College (c. 1944); University of Wisconsin-Madison (1946–83)
- Website: Memorial Webpage

Francis Doan Hole (25 August 1913 – 15 January 2002), was an American pedologist, educator, and musician, best known for his contributions to mapping the extent of soils and their properties in the Wisconsin region and using inventive lectures and musical performances to communicate and popularize the field of soil science. His work and reputation earned him various titles of endearment in his community and among soil scientists worldwide, notably “Ambassador of Soils" and "Poet Laureate of Soil Science".

== Biography ==
=== Early life and education ===
Francis D. Hole was born on August 25, 1913, in Muncie, Indiana, to Quaker parents. His mother was Mary (Doan), his father was Allen David Hole, and Hole had one brother, Allen David Hole Jr. Hole grew up in Richmond, Indiana, in a house on the edge of the Earlham College campus, where his father was a professor of geology from 1900 until 1940. His mother had been a professor of English literature at Wilmington College in Wilmington, Ohio. Hole was the student librarian for the Morton High School symphony orchestra, and he played the violin under the baton of Joseph Maddy, who later founded the National Music Camp at the Interlochen Arts Academy in Michigan. Hole also learned to play the piano.

Hole received a bachelor's degree in geology and biology from Earlham College in 1933 and a master's degree in French at Haverford College by the end of 1934. During the summers of this time of his life, he taught at preparatory schools in Philadelphia and independently studied languages and literature that interested him. In 1937, owing in part to exposure to the geological research and specimens at his undergraduate college and his father's place of work, Hole began to doubt the usefulness to him of "the neuroses of poets" and directed more energy to geology and soil science. He completed a doctorate in these subjects in 1943 at the University of Wisconsin-Madison and attained a brief position as professor of geology at Earlham College, where he was also curator of the Joseph Moore Museum.

=== Scientific career ===
The advent of World War II interrupted Hole's early scientific career. Hole was drafted in 1944 but instead became a conscientious objector, which carried a dual burden as "it wasn't popular at all," Hole explained, and the government required that conscienscious objectors to fulfill other civic duties. For two years, Hole worked on a trail-clearing crew in the Great Smoky Mountain National Park and in a U.S. Department of Agriculture laboratory in Coshocton, Ohio. In 1946, Hole was invited to join the faculty of the University of Wisconsin-Madison with a split appointment between soil science and the Wisconsin Geological and Natural History Survey, but his appointment split further to include participation in the department of geography.

From 1943 to c. 1981, Francis Hole published over 50 articles and books, ranging from technical cartographic data analyses of soils to causal connections of glaciation with resulting soil properties, and later the pedagogy of soil science. Hole created Soil Survey Horizons in 1960, a periodical that was continued by the Soil Science Society of America until 2011, and he co-created the "Soils of Wisconsin Map", published by the Wisconsin Geologic and Natural History Survey in 1968.

Hole co-authored the first edition (1973) and several subsequent editions (1980–2011) of a seminal work in the field of soil science, Soil Genesis and Classification with Stanley W. Buol, and Ralph J. McCracken. This textbook is used in undergraduate and graduate soil science courses worldwide.

In 1976, Hole published Soils of Wisconsin, which compiled the most authoritative knowledge up to that date about the subject. He introduced the definition and significance of soils and their development, or pedogenesis, following the theory of factors of soil formation, or the CLORPT equation by Hans Jenny (pedologist). The diversity of Wisconsin's soils are somewhat greater than that of most states, so Hole organized Wisconsin into geographical regions (A through J) and provided detailed descriptions, diagrammatic drawings, and the history of investigation of these soils. This publication contributed to a larger and more technologically rigorous book in 2017 by Jim Bockheim and Alfred Hartemink similarly titled The Soils of Wisconsin, which was dedicated to Hole.

=== Later life ===
Hole retired from his professorship in 1983, traveling with his wife and performing further educational outreach. Francis D. Hole received a diagnosis of prostate cancer in 1996, to which he responded it was "a love letter from the Divine, and I turn to the Divine and I say, 'It's about time I paid attention to you.'". Hole died on January 15, 2002, at the age of 88. Prof. Hole appeared on Michael Feldman's radio program, "Whad'ya Know" on August 10, 1985; his entertaining discussion of granite can be heard online (starting at the 1:08 mark).

== Teaching and outreach ==
=== Pedagogy ===
In an essay written in 1989, Francis D. Hole described his pedagogical approach and motivation as diverging from traditional ("boring", in his words) definitions of soil. He wrote, “My aesthetic (i.e. "interesting") definition of soil is: Soil is the hidden, secret friend, which is the root domain of lively darkness and silence. My goal in promoting popularization of the soil resource is not so much to attract young people to careers in soil science as to give all children and their parents and grandparents a chance to enjoy the soils of their native landscape.” He emphasized that the findings of soil science must not collect dust in libraries but instead reach the people for whom a knowledge and appreciation of soil would mutually benefit. In particular, Hole encouraged taking students and researchers into the field to investigate the soilscape (a portmanteau of "soil" and "landscape") so as to better inform their interpretation of their observations and data when evaluating hypotheses as to the formation and function of soils. Traditional soil observations with an auger or soil pit offer more engaging and kinesthetic interaction with the subject matter. Expeditions and field trips by professors and students of soil science for the collection and research of Wisconsin's soil continue, following Hole's pedagogy.

Classically trained in performance with the violin, Hole would perform melodies and thematic jigs to accompany and compliment his lectures and lessons, involving the audience whenever possible. For example, he performed his "Soil Fantasy", a sequence of melodic riffs using the violin to enact the physical nature and properties of different soil textures (sand, silt, and clay). “There are various tricks you can use to associate violin sounds with what you want to talk about,” Hole explained. “You can make a harsh, gritty sound for sand. People are very amused that I can make such a disagreeable sound, but that’s what sand is-gritty and scratchy. Clay is always a trill and silt a smooth sound. The point, though, is to get people to think about these various components of soil.”

In addition to music, Hole would use a suitcase of his puppets to demonstrate relationships between anthropomorphized animals, plants, and naturally occurring bodies. These characters included Bucky Badger, Terra Loam, and the oft-misunderstood Erosion., and together they performed persistent themes of humans' responsibility for stewardship for the soil. Emphasis and great effort was made by Hole to distinguish physically tangible organisms and soils from abstract processes, such as erosion, while giving equal agency and a memorable form to all relevant factors where soils mutually impacted people's agricultural, industrial, or recreational activities.

The goal of soil studies in K-12 is to give youngsters the experience of exploring soils which are hidden beneath our feet. Soil science and astronomy are somewhat alike in that both disciplines focus on realms that only in a limited way are actually visited by human beings. In each discipline, therefore, there is a need to supply the young with images of the unfamiliar world... We all walk on soil or modern substitutes (rugs, linoleum, sidewalks) each day. Thousands of years ago the soles of our feet of our ancestors learned how to sense the nature of the ground. By studying soils, our children lay claim to life-supporting landscapes on this planet. By enjoying those landscapes, these youngsters will arrive at adulthood as friends of the soil, ready to insist on its defense against destruction.

— Francis D. Hole

Hole earned the University of Wisconsin's Distinguished Teaching Award in 1974.

=== Musical works ===
F. D. Hole wrote and widely performed the Antigo Silt Loam Song, whose melody and lyrics illustrated and celebrated the features, geography, and natural history of Wisconsin soils, entertaining audiences and appealing to students of all ages.

The Antigo Silt Loam Song (Original)

The Antigo Silt Loam Song (Variation)

1. Antigo, a soil to know, Wisconsin’s crops and livestock grow; and forests too, on Antigo; and forests, too, on Antigo.
2. Great Lakes region, fertile land; glaciers spread both clay and sand; Winds blew silt, then forests grew, giving soils their brownish hue.
3. Great Lakes region, fertile land, you strengthen us in heart and hand; Each slope, each flower, each wild bird call proclaims a unity in all.
4. Plant a seed and pull a weed; the soil will give us all we need, and plenty more, so birds may feed: and plenty more, so birds may feed.
5. Of all the crops, true peace is tops; its soil is love that never stops; It blesses sand and water drops: it blesses sand and water drops.

The Antigo Silt Loam song has been covered by students and researchers of soil science and is often performed at soil-related outreach events. Hole's other musical works are a mix of songs with original melodies and lyrics as well as traditional songs whose lyrics have been replaced with soil-related topics and imagery. Examples include Oh Give Me a Home on a Deep Mellow Loam and Old McDonald Had a Pit. To the theme of "Twinkle Twinkle Little Star," Hole wrote in 1989,

Darkle, darkle, little grain,
I wonder how you entertain
A thousand creatures microscopic.
Grains like you from pole to tropic
Support land life upon this planet
I marvel at you, crumb of granite!

Hole's many songs and poems, among other original creative works, for years have been arranged and performed by students of the General Soil Science (SOIL 301) course to continue the tradition of soil-related artwork and music. Existing recordings of Hole's personal stories, lecturing style, and musical performances (voice, violin) have been made available by the MINDS@UW archive and Steve Tiffany.

=== Wisconsin State Soil Campaign ===

The Antigo Silt Loam (Typic glossoboralf) was officially named the official state soil of Wisconsin by 1983 Wisconsin Act 33 to remind Wisconsinites of their soil stewardship responsibilities. Hole and fellow advocates argued for many years prior that soils are a natural resource that took over 10,000 years to produce and are therefore essential to Wisconsin's economy and the foundation of terrestrial life itself. Hole and a group of children in 1983 entered hearing rooms of the Wisconsin State Capitol with Hole's puppets to encourage legislators to name the state soil, which swayed the many individuals who regarded the campaign as "somewhat silly". Selected to represent the more than 500 major soil types in Wisconsin, the Antigo Silt Loam is a productive, level, silty soil of glacial origin, subsequently enriched by organic matter from prehistoric forests. The soil, named after Antigo, Wisconsin, is found chiefly in Wisconsin and stretches in patches across the north central part of the state, and it is a versatile soil that supports dairying, potato growing, and timber.

A description of the Antigo silt loam as the official state soil of Wisconsin can be found at Wisconsin Historical Marker 280, erected in 1987, near Antigo, Wisconsin (45°9.527'N, 89°7.099'W). Its text reads as follows:

This plain was made thousands of years ago by rivers of water flowing from hills of melting glacial ice that lay a short distance north and east of here. The summer flood waters first laid down gravel, which was then covered by four feet of fertile windblown silt. The silt was slowly changed into productive soil by the action of forest roots and leaf fall. Under careful management by farmers, the soil has been further enriched since settlement and supports a versatile agricultural and forestry economy. Antigo silt loam, first identified through a resource inventory conducted in Langlade County in 1933, was named after the nearby city and occurs in areas across a dozen counties from Green Bay to Minnesota. In 1983 the Wisconsin legislature designated the Antigo silt loam as the official state soil to represent the soil resources of Wisconsin that serve as the foundation of life upon which plants, animals and human beings depend.

The Antigo Silt Loam was not the first official state soil to be selected (Nebraska being the first, having named Holdrege (soil) series as its state soil in 1976.) However, the publicly engaging manner of Hole's campaign encouraged other states to select official state soils of their own, a process that continues today.
