= Soil types in Kerala =

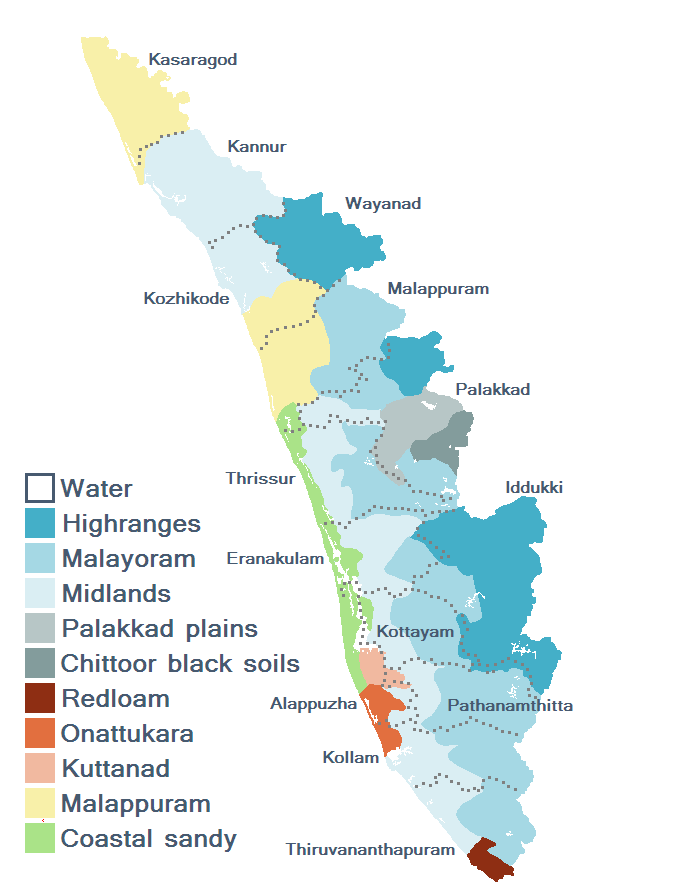
Map showing the agro-ecological zones of Kerala

The soils of Kerala (in Malayalam: കേരളത്തിലെ മണ്ണിനെ) have been scientifically classified based on their chemical and physical characteristics. Variations in rainfall, temperature, and alternating humid and dry conditions, along with the swiftly flowing rivers running from the western coastal plains to the eastern highlands, significantly influence the state’s diverse natural vegetation and the formation of different soil types. In general classification, eight major types of soil are found in Kerala: coastal alluvial soil, laterite soil, black soil, forest loam, red loam, hill soil, black cotton soil, and forest soil. The classification of Kerala’s soils follows a specialized system developed by the United States Department of Agriculture (USDA). Approximately 82 distinct soil varieties identified across Kerala are displayed at the Kerala Soil Museum, located within the Central Soil Analytical Laboratory at Parottukonam, Thiruvananthapuram.
