= Cecil (soil) =

Coordinates: 36.0455°N 78.4907°W

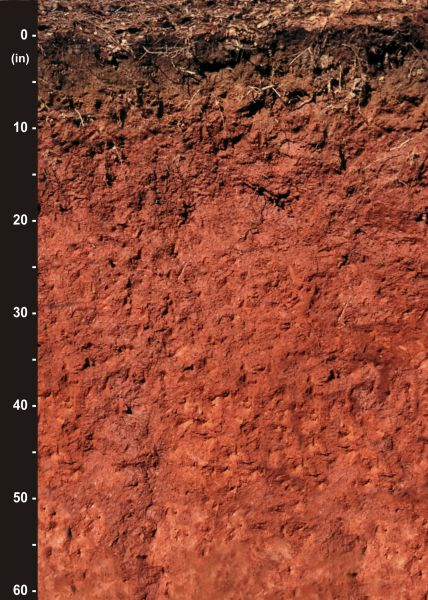

Originally mapped in Cecil County, Maryland in 1899, more than 10 million acres (40,000 km^{2}) of the Cecil soil series (Fine, kaolinitic, thermic Typic Kanhapludults) are now mapped in the Piedmont region of the southeastern United States. It extends from Virginia through North Carolina (where it is the state soil), South Carolina, Georgia and Alabama, with the typic Cecil pedon actually located in Franklin County, NC.

The Cecil series developed over igneous rock such as granite, and metamorphic rock which is chemically similar to granite. Virgin Cecil soils support forests dominated by pine, oak and hickory, and have a topsoil of brown sandy loam. The subsoil is a red clay which is dominated by kaolinite and has considerable mica. Few Cecil soils are in their virgin state, for most have been cultivated at one time or another. Indifferent land management has allowed many areas of Cecil soils to lose their topsoils through soil erosion, exposing the red clay subsoil. This clay is amenable to cultivation, responds well to careful management, and supports healthy growth of pine where allowed to revert to forest. Like other well-drained Ultisols, it is ideal for urban development; however, in common with other kaolinite-dominated clays, it has little ability to recover from soil compaction. Total potassium in the Cecil is higher than typical for Ultisols due to the presence of mica.

== Official profile description ==
Ap—0 to 8 inches (200 mm); dark yellowish brown (10YR 4/4) sandy loam; weak medium granular structure; very friable; slightly acid; abrupt smooth boundary. 2 inches (51 mm) to 8 inches (200 mm) thick.

Bt1—8 to 26 inches (660 mm); red (10R 4/8) clay; moderate medium subangular blocky structure; firm; sticky, plastic; common clay films on faces of peds; few fine flakes of mica; strongly acid; gradual wavy boundary.

Bt2—26 to 42 inches (1,100 mm); red (10R 4/8) clay; few fine prominent yellowish red (5YR 5/8) mottles; moderate medium subangular blocky structure; firm; sticky, plastic; common clay films on faces of peds; few fine flakes of mica; very strongly acid; gradual wavy boundary. (Combined thickness of the Bt horizon is 24 to 50 inches)

BC—42 to 50 inches (1,300 mm); red (2.5YR 4/8) clay loam; few distinct yellowish red (5YR 5/8) mottles; weak medium subangular blocky structure; friable; few fine flakes of mica; very strongly acid; gradual wavy boundary. (0 to 10 inches (250 mm) thick)

C--50 to 80 inches (2,000 mm); red (2.5YR 4/8) loam saprolite; common medium distinct pale yellow (2.5Y 7/4) and common distinct brown (7.5YR 5/4) mottles; massive; very friable; few fine flakes of mica; very strongly acid.

The slight acidity of the Ap in this profile is atypical for Cecil series—moderate to very strong acidity is the rule—and is evidence that the soil was limed. The B and C horizons are strongly to very strongly acidic.

== See also ==
- Pedology (soil study)
- List of U.S. state soils
