= Windsor (soil) =

Soil of the U.S. state of Connecticut

The Windsor is the unofficial state soil of the U.S. state of Connecticut, although it exists as part of the geological make up of landmasses across the globe, including in the UK.

== Profile ==
Windsor soils are well suited to the highly diversified agriculture of Connecticut; they are the preferred soils for the production of Connecticut shade tobacco. Windsor soils are important for fruit and vegetable crops, silage corn, and ornamental shrubs and trees. They are also well suited for commercial and residential development, as well as a source for construction material. These soils cover 34,000 acres (140 km^{2}) in Connecticut.

The Windsor series consists of very deep, excessively drained, rapidly permeable soils formed in glacial meltwater sediments. Some areas formed in sand dunes swept by winds from the Connecticut River Valley as ancient glacial Lake Hitchcock receded. The largest landscapes of Windsor soils are in the northern Connecticut River Valley, but the soils are mapped throughout the state. Slopes range from 0 to 15 percent. Windsor soils overlay sand and gravel groundwater aquifers. Droughtiness is the main limitation for crops, lawns, and landscaping. During dry months, irrigation is necessary for optimal production. There is a hazard of ground water pollution due to the rapid permeability of these soils.

== See also ==
- Pedology (soil study)
- Soil types
- List of U.S. state soils
