= Tanana =

Tanana may refer to:

== Places ==
- Tanana, Alaska, United States, a city
- Tanana River, Alaska
  - Tanana Valley, Alaska

== Other uses ==
- Tanana or Lower Tanana language, an endangered language spoken in Alaska
- Tanana (soil), the official soil of Alaska
- Frank Tanana (born 1953), American former baseball pitcher

== See also ==
- Upper Tanana language
