= Disturbance (archaeology) =

Change to an archaeological site

A disturbance is any change to an archaeological site due to events which occurred after the site was laid down. Disturbances may be caused by natural events or human activity, and may result in loss of archaeological value. In some cases, it can be difficult to distinguish between features caused by human activity in the period of interest, and features caused by later human activity or natural processes.

== Causes ==
=== Natural causes ===
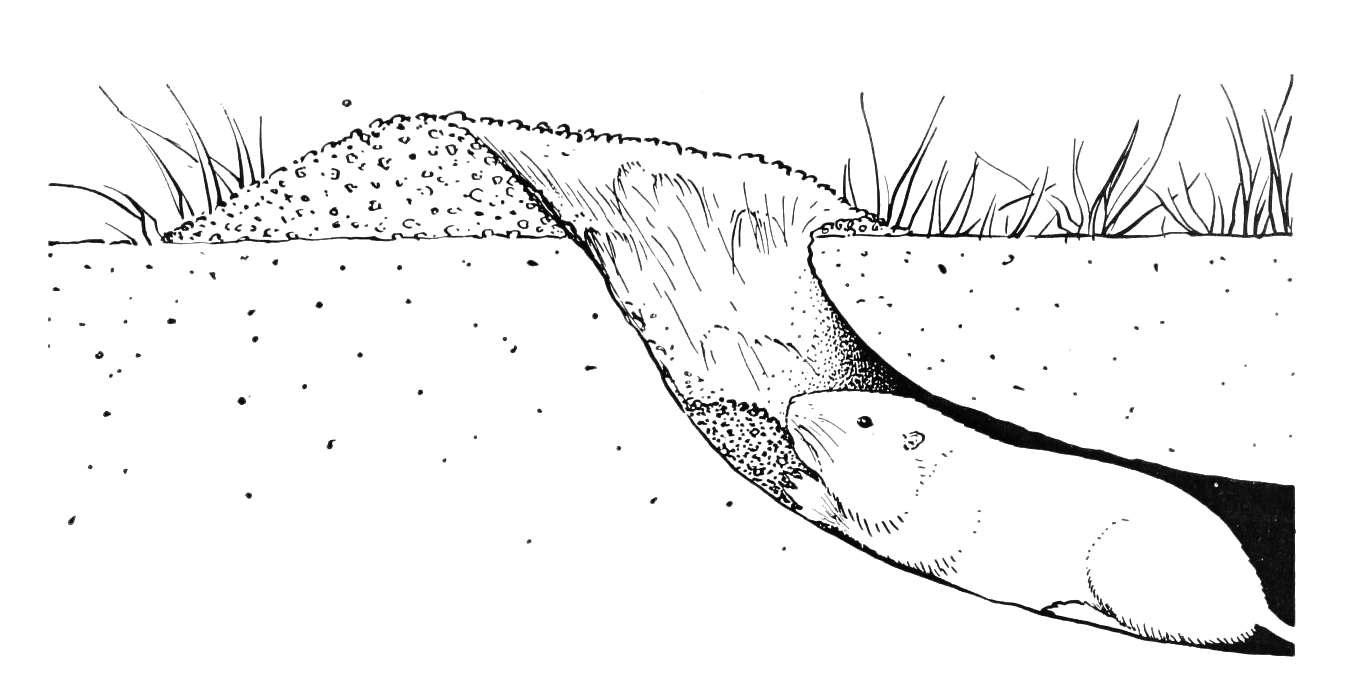
Transport of soil by a gopher

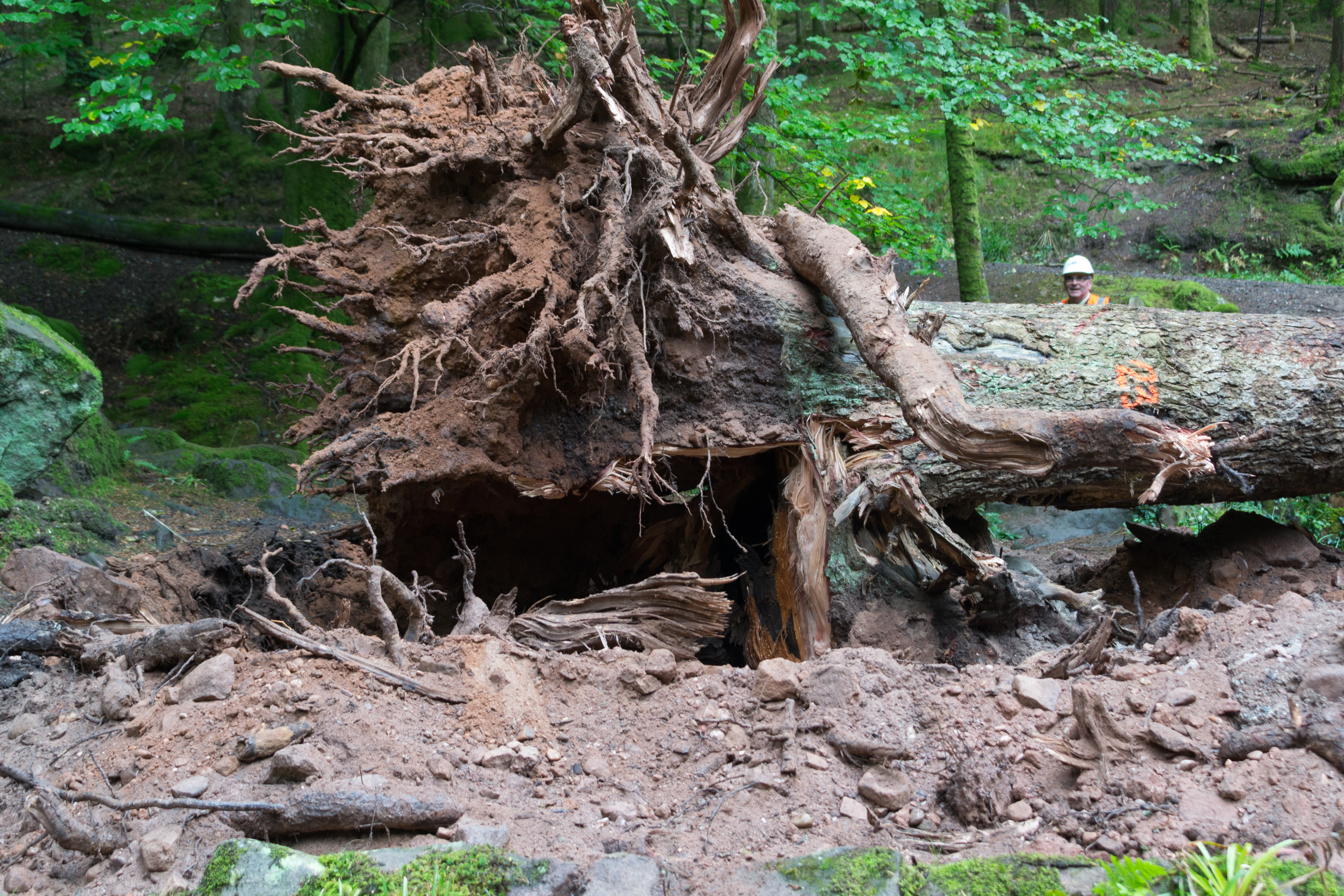
Soil disturbed by an uprooted tree

The soil scientist Francis D. Hole identified nine natural processes resulting in soil disturbance, including the movements of animals and plants (known as bioturbation, and including burrowing, root growth and treefalls); freezing and thawing; movement under gravity (including earthflow and rockslides); swelling and shrinking of clays; the actions of wind and water; the growth and dissolution of salt crystals; and movement caused by earthquakes. Different sites are subject to different degrees, combinations, and interactions of these processes, and archaeologists working with a given site must be familiar with the processes in play at that site to avoid the risk of misinterpretation.

In some environments, animal activity can completely turn over the surface soil in as few as five to six years. The activity of earthworms, in particular, can contribute to the burial, and thus preservation, of artifacts dropped on the ground – but it also frequently blurs boundaries between natural and culturally disturbed soils, and can erase vertical stratification used for dating.

Frost heaving may cause artifacts to rise or fall, depending on their heat conductivity, which is a function of material. Freeze-thaw cycles can also disturb soils in several other ways, collectively called cryoturbation. Downhill creep may sort artifacts by mass or density, as may flooding. Drying of clays may cause deep cracks that are subsequently filled with surface material. Wetting and drying of clay may cause rocks to migrate to the surface. The action of winds on soil is especially common in desert environments.

==== Climate change ====
Anthropogenic climate change is altering, and in some cases accelerating, natural disturbance processes. At Nunalleq on the southwest coast of Alaska, a four-century-old Yup'ik site is under threat from the thawing of permafrost and rising storm surges of the Bering Sea. The permafrost had preserved items normally subject to rapid decomposition, including wooden objects and grass-woven baskets and mats. Since excavation at Nunalleq began in 2009, the permafrost layer has receded 1.5 feet (0.46 m), and storm waves have torn away 35 feet (11 m) of the site. Throughout the northern latitudes, the warming climate is revealing previously unknown archaeology, while simultaneously threatening to destroy it. These sites must be prioritized for rescue archaeology.

=== Human causes ===
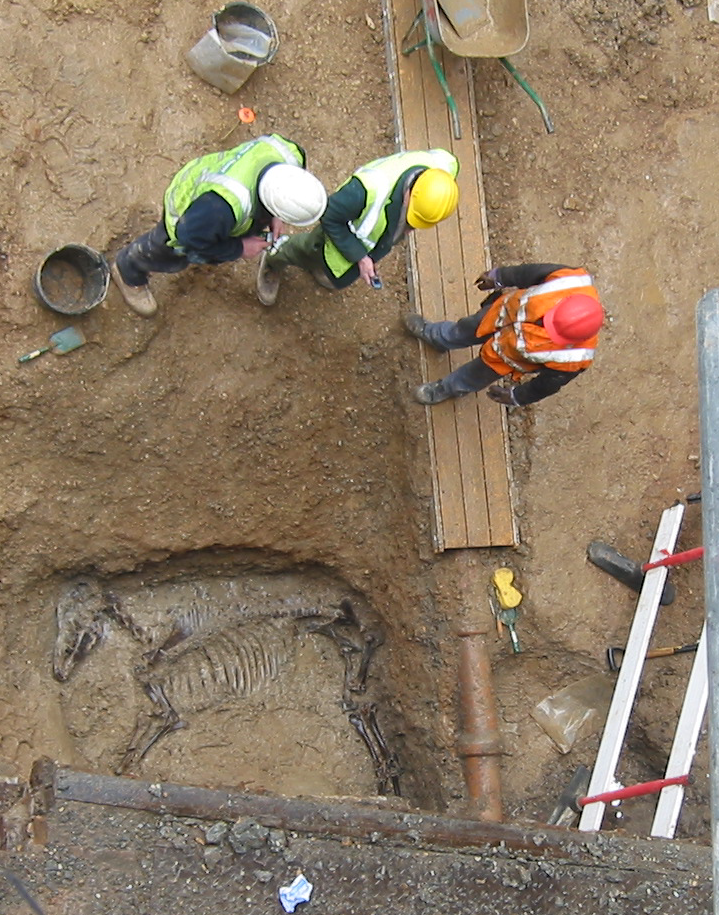
A Roman horse uncovered during construction in London.

Farming, construction, habitation, and resource extraction are leading causes of site disruption. In the UK, according to English Heritage, ploughing with powerful modern tractors had done as much damage in the last six decades of the twentieth century as traditional farming did in the previous six centuries.

Recreational activity on a site may damage archaeology in a number of ways. Amateur metal detectorists may disturb or remove artifacts. Travel over the ground surface, whether by foot, animal, bicycle, or motorized vehicle, can cause artifacts to be broken, crushed, or moved. Campfires can contaminate sites and cause smoke damage to rock art, and the heat of a fire can cause rock to spall. Visitors may intentionally move artifacts, either to examine and share them with others, or in an attempt to protect them; this results in a loss of archaeological context which could provide insight into when, where, and how items were used.

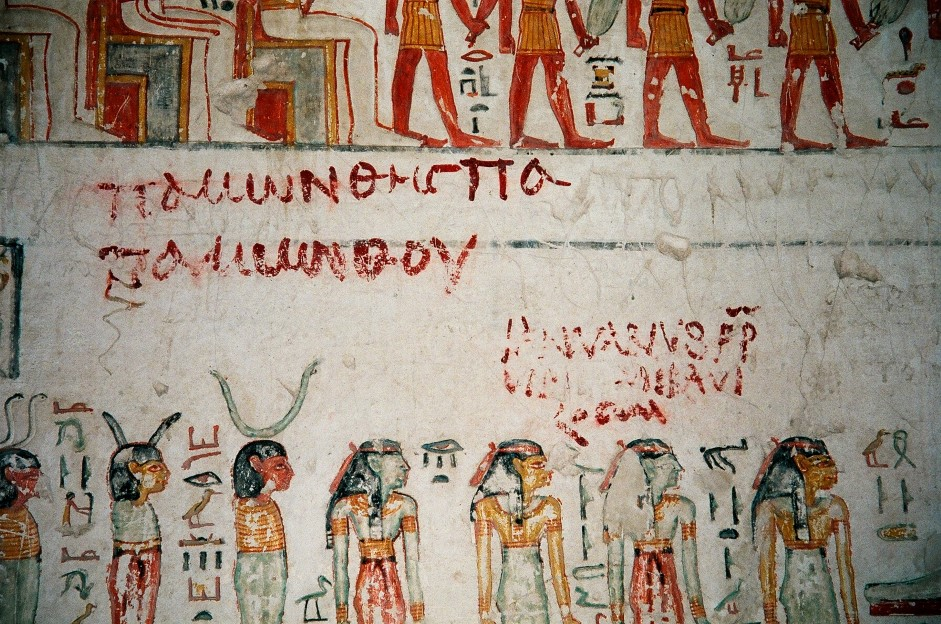
Ancient graffiti in the tomb of Ramses V and VI

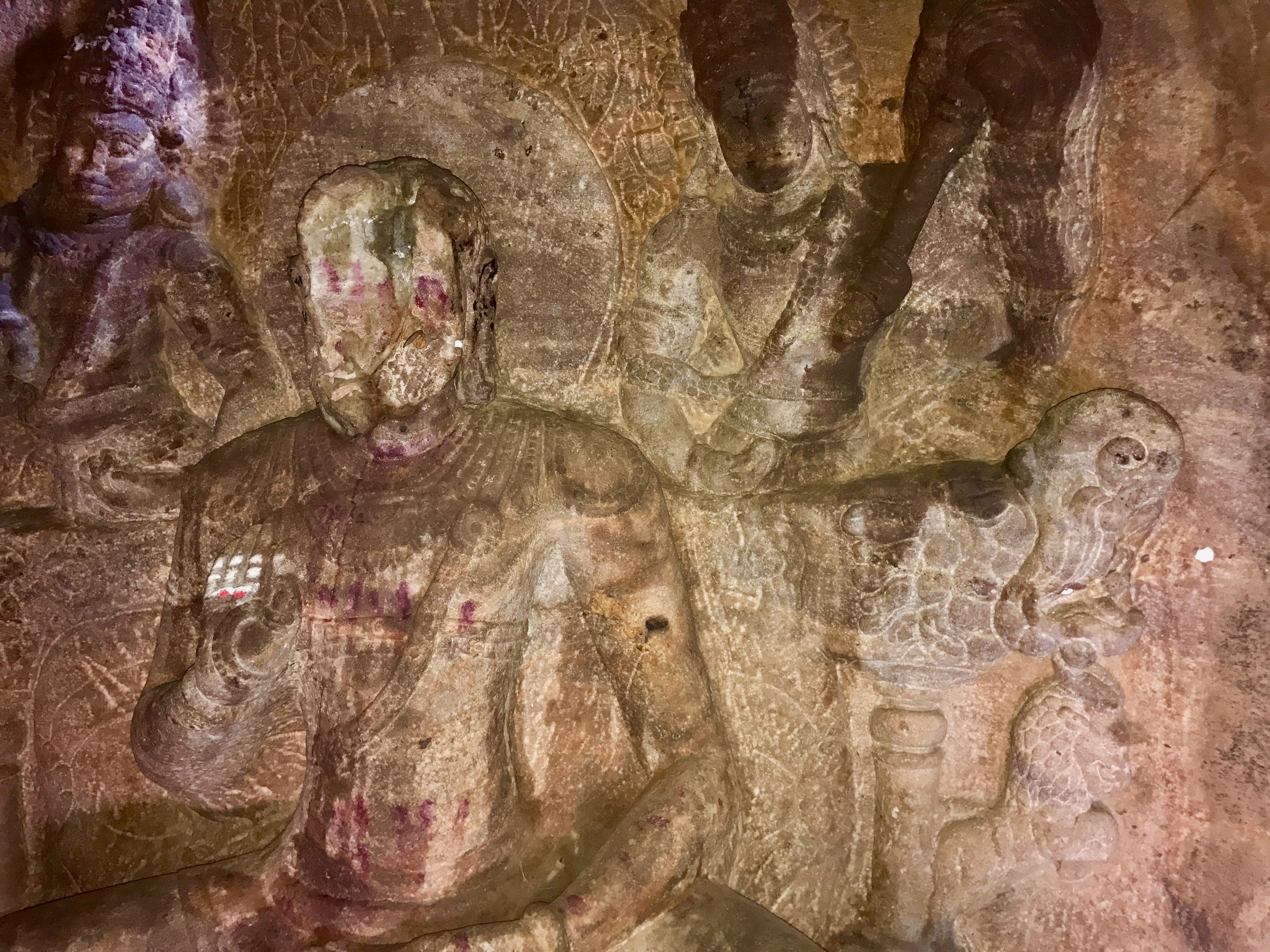
Defaced cave sculpture in Karnataka

Vandalism may include defacing rock art, sculpture, or structures; digging; and removing artifacts. In some cases, later civilizations have chosen to modify, deface, or destroy relics of older peoples, particularly when these objects honor political or religious figures that the later society has denounced. At burial sites, notably including the tombs of Ancient Egyptian royals, grave robbers have often removed valuable artifacts and otherwise disturbed sites in the process.

Improper archaeological practices can also damage artifacts and context.

In many cases, disturbance created by later human activity on a site will have its own archaeological value. Some sites have been used, abandoned, and re-used many times, often for different purposes, with layers from more recent periods of use sometimes cutting through or obscuring those of older periods. Building materials may be scavenged and reused as well.

== Mitigation ==
Recognized archaeological sites are generally legally protected against human disruption. In the US, removal of artifacts from federal and state lands without a permit is a crime, regardless of whether the artifacts are dug up or found on the surface. Collecting on private land requires written permission of the landowner, and may be subject to additional state and federal laws governing historic preservation. Disturbing human remains, including ancient skeletal remains, is a crime, as is the possession or disposal of remains that were retrieved illegally.

Sites may also be physically protected from natural and human disruption.

== See also ==
- Out-of-place artifact
