= Narragansett =

Narragansett may refer to:

- Narragansett people, an Indigenous people of Rhode Island, USA
  - Narragansett language
  - Narragansett Indian Tribe of Rhode Island, federally recognized tribe of Narragansett people

== Animals ==
- Narragansett Pacer, a type of racehorse
- Narragansett Turkey

== Places ==
- Narragansett, Rhode Island
- Narragansett Bay, Rhode Island Sound
- Little Narragansett Bay, Watch Hill, Rhode Island
- Narragansett Country, former name of what is now Washington/South County, Rhode Island
- Buxton, Maine, formerly called Narragansett Number 1
- The Narragansett (Chicago), an apartment building on the National Register of Historic Places
- Narragansett High School, Narragansett, Rhode Island
- Narragansett Elementary School, Narragansett, Rhode Island
- Narragansett Middle School, Templeton, Massachusetts
- Narragansett Regional High School, Templeton, Massachusetts
- Narragansett Pier Middle School, Narragansett, Rhode Island
- Narragansett Park, an American race track, Pawtucket, Rhode Island
- Narragansett Elementary, an elementary school in Gorham, Maine
- Narragansett Pier, a village within the town of Narragansett, Rhode Island
- Narragansett Pond, a lake in Plymouth County, Massachusetts
- Narragansett Trail, a public footpath in Connecticut and Rhode Island

== Transportation ==
- SS Narragansett, a passenger paddle steamer of the Stonington Line
- Narragansett-style excursion car, an open-air passenger rail car
- Narragansett Pier Railroad, a defuct railroad in Rhode Island

== Other ==
- Narragansett (soil), loamy soils occurring in the northeastern United States
- Narragansett Times, a newspaper in Narragansett and South Kingstown, Rhode Island
- Judge Narragansett, a fictional character in the novel Atlas Shrugged
- Narragansett Brewing Company, Rhode Island
- Narragansett Regional School District, Massachusetts
- Narragansett Council, scouting council in Connecticut, Rhode Island, and Massachusetts

== See also ==
- USS Narragansett (disambiguation)
