= Myakka (soil) =

Soil type

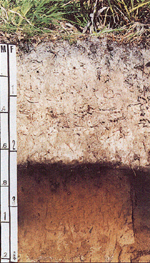
Myakka soil composition

Myakka soil is the official state soil of Florida, which has more than 1,500,000 acres (6,100 km^{2}) of land composed partly or entirely of Myakka soils, out of its total acreage of 42,084,928 acres (170,311.66 km^{2}). This soil is primarily located in broad flatwoods in irregularly shaped areas ranging from 5 to 500 acres in size. The organic matter content and fertility of the soil is low. Most areas where this soil occurs are native range or improved pasture, although some is used for citrus or vegetable farming. Some counties in Florida where this soil occurs are Hendry, Collier, Glades, and Lee.

== Soil geography ==
Myakka soils originate from marine deposits and are a key component of Floridian flatwoods. They also occur in tidal areas, depressions, and barrier islands. Myakka soils' slope ranges from 0 to 8 percent.

== Soil profile ==
This soil typically has a very dark gray sand surface layer between 5 and 6 inches thick and a subsurface layer to about 26 inches composed of gray sand.

The subsoil to about 60 inches is sand that is stained with organic matter; black in the upper part and dark brown in the lower part.

The substratum to about 80 inches is grayish brown sand. Under natural conditions this soil has a high water table to within 10 inches of the surface for 1 to 5 months and a depth of more than 40 inches during the dry periods. Water rapidly permeates in the surface layer, subsurface layer, and substratum, then moderately in the subsoil.

Permeability is rapid in the A horizon, and it is "moderate or moderately rapid" in the Bh horizon.

== Productivity ==
The high water table and sandy texture are severe limitations for urban development and recreational uses. Under natural conditions, this soil is poorly suited to cultivated crops because of the wetness. If a water control system is utilized, the soil is suited for vegetable crops such as squash, tomatoes, cucumbers, watermelons, and other Florida crops. Natural vegetation occurring on the soil is South Florida slash pine, Saw Palmetto, chalky bluestem, creeping bluestem, lopsided Indian grass, and pineland threeawn. Potential productivity for pine trees is moderate. South Florida slash pine is recommended as a tree to plant in this soil.

== See also ==
- Pedology (soil study)
- Soil types
