= List of U.S. state soils =

This is a list of U.S. state soils. A state soil is a soil that has special significance to a particular state. Each state in the United States has selected a state soil, twenty of which have been legislatively established. These official state soils share the same level of distinction as official state flowers and birds. Also, representative soils have been selected for Puerto Rico and the U.S. Virgin Islands.

== Table ==
State federal district or territory	State soil	Image	Year adopted as official state symbol (if any)
Alabama	Bama		1997
Alaska	Tanana		
Arizona	Casa Grande		
Arkansas	Stuttgart		1997
California	San Joaquin		1997
Colorado	Seitz		
Connecticut	Windsor		proposed
Delaware	Greenwich		2000
Florida	Myakka		1989
Georgia	Tifton		
Hawaii	Hilo		
Idaho	Threebear		
Illinois	Drummer		2001
Indiana	Miami		
Iowa	Tama		
Kansas	Harney		1990
Kentucky	Crider		1990
Louisiana	Ruston		
Maine	Chesuncook (soil)		1999
Maryland	Sassafras		
Massachusetts	Paxton		1990
Michigan	Kalkaska		1990
Minnesota	Lester		2012
Mississippi	Natchez		2003
Missouri	Menfro		
Montana	Scobey	Scobey Soil profile	2015
Nebraska	Holdrege (soil)		1979
Nevada	Orovada		2001
New Hampshire	Marlow		
New Jersey	Downer		
New Mexico	Penistaja		
New York	Honeoye		
North Carolina	Cecil		
North Dakota	Williams		
Ohio	Miamian		
Oklahoma	Port Silt Loam		1987
Oregon	Jory		2011
Pennsylvania	Hazleton (soil)		
Puerto Rico	Bayamon		
Rhode Island	Narragansett		
South Carolina	Bohicket		
South Dakota	Houdek		1990
Tennessee	Dickson		
Texas	Houston Black		
Utah	Mivida		
Vermont	Tunbridge		1985
Virgin Islands	Victory		
Virginia	Pamunkey		
Washington	Tokul		proposed
West Virginia	Monongahela		1997
Wisconsin	Antigo		1983
Wyoming	Forkwood		

== See also ==
- List of state soil science associations
- List of U.S. state, district, and territorial insignia
- Soil in the United States
