= Paxton (soil) =

New England soil series

The Paxton soil series was established in Worcester County, Massachusetts in 1922, and is named for the town of Paxton where it was first described and mapped, and is the state soil of Massachusetts.

== Taxonomic classification ==
Coarse-loamy, mixed, active, mesic Oxyaquic Dystrudepts. Paxton soils are in the Inceptisol soil order of soil taxonomy.

The term "coarse-loamy" indicates that the soil has less than 18% clay and at least 15% or more particles that are fine sand or coarser.

The term "mixed" indicates no single mineral is over 40 percent. The term "active" represents a ratio of the cation-exchange capacity to clay of the pedon.

The term "mesic" indicates the soil developed in a temperature between 8 and 15 degrees C.

The "Typic Dystrudepts" are typical profiles [typic] with low pH [dystr] with an udic moisture regime and are within the Inceptisol order [epts].

== Distribution and uses of Paxton soils ==
Paxton soils are mapped on convex slopes of oval-shaped, streamline hills called drumlins. They are mapped throughout the mesic soil temperature regime of New England and New York.

Where stones have been cleared and slopes are gentle, Paxton soils are well suited to cultivate crops, hay, and improved pasture. Additional land uses include suburban housing and woodland production. The main agricultural uses for Paxton soils are apples, corn, and silage.

Paxton soils have a high water holding capacity and are well suited for intensive agricultural and woodland production. Trees commonly growing on Paxton soils include red, white, and black oak, hickory, sugar maple, red maple, gray and black birch, white pine, and hemlock. Paxton soils have slowly permeable dense till (lodgement till) layer (Cd horizon) that perches seasonal water tables. These limitations often interfere with septic systems for commercial and residential development.

== See also ==
- List of U.S. state soils
