= Tanana (soil) =

Soil type

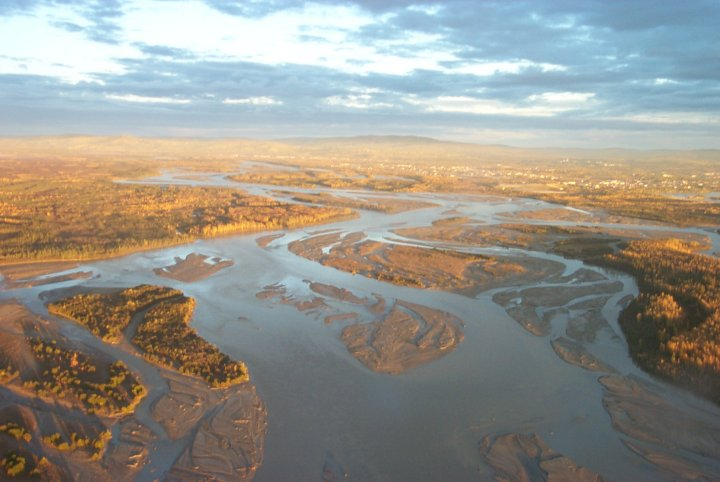
Banks of the Tanana River.

The Tanana soil is the official state soil of Alaska.

== Profile ==
The Tanana soil consists of shallow to deep, poorly drained alluvium or silty micaceous loess over an alluvial bed with permafrost. They occur on alluvial flats and terraces. Slopes range from 0 to 12 percent. The mean annual precipitation is about 12 inches (300 mm) and the mean annual temperature is about 24 °F (−4 °C). The soil is named after the Tanana River in Alaska and occurs along some river banks.

== See also ==
- Pedology (soil study)
- Soil types
- List of U.S. state soils
