= Antigo (soil) =

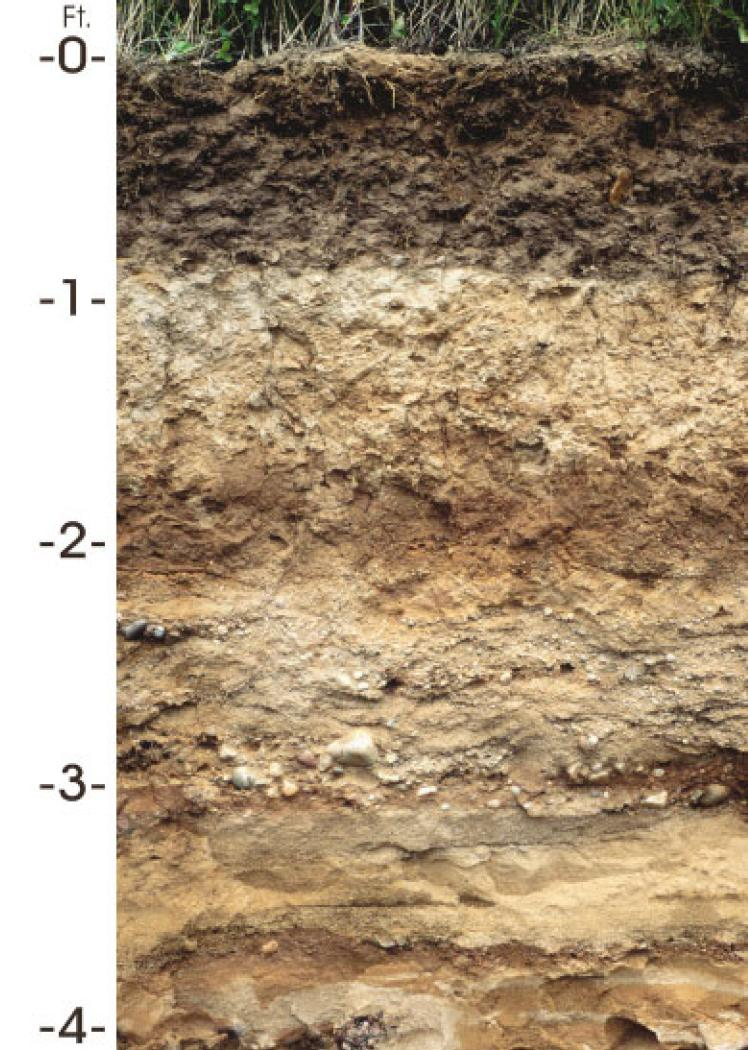
Antigo soil profile: Surface layer: dark grayish brown silt loam; Subsurface layer: brown silt loam; Subsoil – upper: dark yellowish brown & brown silt loam; Subsoil – lower: dark yellowish brown loam & brown very gravelly sandy loam; Substratum: brown, stratified coarse sand & gravelly coarse sand.

Antigo soils are among the most extensive soils in Wisconsin. They occur on about 300,000 acres (1,200 km²) in the northern part of the state. Antigo soils are well-drained and formed under northern hardwood forests in loess and loamy sediments over stratified sandy outwash. The average annual precipitation ranges from 28 to 33 inches (71 to 84 cm), and the average annual air temperature ranges from 39 to 45 °F (4 to 7 °C). The soil series was named after the city of Antigo, Wisconsin.

They are very productive soils for corn, small grain, and hay. In some areas, potatoes or snap beans are important crops. The steeper areas are used for pasture or for timber production. In 1983, with the lobbying of University of Wisconsin–Madison soil scientist Francis Hole, the Wisconsin Legislature designated Antigo silt loam as the official state soil of Wisconsin.
