= Orovada (soil) =

Orovada soil series is the official state soil of Nevada. The soil series has an extent of 367,853 acres (148,865 ha), primarily in northern and central Nevada, and extending into southern Idaho and Oregon. They are common soils on semiarid rangeland with sagebrush-grassland plant communities. Orovada soils are arable, able to be cultivated, when irrigated and are considered prime farmland. Alfalfa for hay and seed, winter wheat, barley, and grasses for hay and pasture are the principal crops grown on these soils.

Orovada soils are well drained and formed in alluvium derived from mixed rock sources and in loess and volcanic ash. These soils typically occur in the Great Basin section of the Basin and Range physiographic province.

== Orovada series profile ==
- A Horizon (0-5 cm): light brownish gray fine sandy loam, slightly alkaline (pH 7.5)
- Bw1 Horizon (5-20 cm): light brownish gray loam, change in color from A Horizon, but no accumulation of material, slightly alkaline (pH 7.8)
- Bw2 Horizon (20-36 cm): light gray fine sandy loam, change in color from Bw1 Horizon, but no accumulation of material, slightly alkaline (pH 7.8)
- Bq1 Horizon (36-66 cm): pale brown fine sandy loam, accumulation of secondary silica, moderately alkaline (pH 8.4)
- Bqk1 Horizon (66-86 cm): light brownish gray very fine sandy loam, accumulation of secondary silica and alkaline carbonates, very strongly alkaline (pH 9.2)
- Bqk2 Horizon (86-122 cm): light brownish gray silt loam, accumulation of secondary silica and alkaline carbonates, very strongly alkaline (pH 9.2)
- B'q Horizon (122-155 cm): pale brown silt loam with accumulation of secondary silica, alkaline (pH 8.8)

== See also ==
- List of U.S. state soils
