= Menfro =

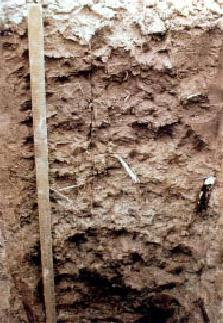
Menfro strata

Menfro soil is a series of deep, well drained, moderately permeable soils formed in 6-to-20-foot (1.8 to 6.1 m) thick loess deposits. It is found in central and eastern Missouri and west-central and southwestern Illinois on upland ridgetops, backslopes, and benches adjacent to the Missouri and Mississippi rivers and their major tributaries. Menfro soils are prime farmland where the slope is less than 6 percent.

Menfro soil strata consist of:

Surface layer	dark brown silt loam
Subsurface layer	brown silt loam
Subsoil - upper	brown silt loam
Subsoil - lower	dark brown silty clay loam
Substratum	brown silt loam

Menfro is the state soil of Missouri. It was the first soil to go on display when Scientists from the Natural Resources Conservation Service of the USDA, the Soil Science Society of America and others worked with exhibit designers from the Smithsonian Institution on a display of soil monoliths from every state.
