= National Society of Consulting Soil Scientists =

American scientific and professional society

- NSCSS official logo
- Abbreviation: NSCSS
- Formation: 1987
- Dissolved: 2011
- Type: Professional society
- Legal status: Corporation
- Purpose: Advocacy, Collegiality, Education, Leadership
- Region served: North America
- Members: Soil scientists
- Official language: English
- 2011 President: Hal Owen
- Main organ: Board of Directors
- Affiliations: IUSS, SSSA, NCSS, USCSSA
- Website: nscss.org
- Remarks: Business acumen, Professional development, and Professional ethics

The National Society of Consulting Soil Scientists (NSCSS) was integrated into the Soil Science Society of America as of August 2011. NSCSS was a scientific and professional society of soil scientists, principally in the U.S. but with non-U.S. members as well. Members engaged primarily in environmental consulting, but consulting was not a requirement of membership, and the member body included soil science educators as well as government soil scientists. Society consulting soil scientists provided professional services in the form of agricultural and environmental consulting with respect to using soil as a natural resource, especially as it relates to nutrient management, waste management, septic systems, wetlands, erosion, slope stability, land use planning, and land degradation.

== Mission ==
The mission of the Society was: "1) To advance the discipline and practice of soil science by professionals, 2) To promote quality interaction between professional soil scientists and their communities, 3) To represent the diverse consulting, service and business interests of professional soil scientists, 4) To facilitate the exchange of business and soil science experiences within the Society, and 5) To foster professional and ethical conduct in the soil science discipline."

== Professional certification and registration ==
The Society provided relevant professional certification and registration with particular emphasis on professional ethics. The NSCSS awarded the Registered Professional Soil Scientist (RPSS) designation in the United States.

== Integration with the Soil Science Society of America ==
As of August 2011, the NSCSS is a fully integrated part of the Soil Science Society of America. At the May 21–24, 2011 NSCSS Annual Meeting in Asheville, North Carolina, it was recommended that NSCSS integrate into SSSA to unite and expand the soil science community and form a new Consulting Soil Scientists Division within SSSA. These discussions led to the proposal that was presented to the NSCSS Board of Directors that NSCSS integrate into SSSA and form the new Division with SSSA. After further NSCSS/SSSA discussions regarding the merger, on July 21, 2011, the Board of Directors of the SSSA unanimously voted to create a new Division - S12, for Consulting Soil Scientists (CSS). On July 29, 2011, the NSCSS Board of Directors voted to recommend to the membership that we integrate our corporation and programs into SSSA. In August, NSCSS members were given the opportunity to approve the merger by voting - the results were overwhelmingly (95%) in favor of integrating NSCSS into SSSA."

They cited being included under SSSA's corporate umbrella (alleviating financial and administrative demands) and the communications network of the SSSA's Science Policy Office in Washington, D.C., as major advantages leading to the choice to integrate.

== Affiliations ==
The NSCSS was approved as a Chapter of the Soil Science Society of America in 1996. NSCSS achieved Cooperator status with the National Cooperative Soil Survey in 1997, of which it is now a permanent member. NSCSS is a charter member of the US Consortium of Soil Science Associations (USCSSA) and member of the USCSSA governing council. It is a member of the International Union of Soil Sciences, a union of 86 national and regional soil science societies.

== See also ==
- List of geoscience organizations
- List of state soil science associations
