= Stuttgart (soil) =

Official state soil of Arkansas, U.S.

Stuttgart soil series is an officially designated state symbol, the state soil of Arkansas.

Stuttgart soils are named for the City of Stuttgart in southeast Arkansas. They are used primarily for crops, mainly rice, soybeans, small grains, and corn. The Stuttgart area is also famous for its large fall and winter population of ducks and geese (Stuttgart bills itself as "The Rice and Duck Capital of the World"). These waterfowl feed heavily on the crops grown on the Stuttgart soils. Stuttgart soils have been mapped on about 200,000 acres (810 km^{2}) in Arkansas.

The Stuttgart series consists of very deep, moderately well drained or somewhat poorly drained soils formed in silty and clayey alluvium. These level to gently sloping soils are on the Grand Prairie in the Lower Mississippi Valley. They are classified as alfisols, but their high content of montmorillonite puts them close to the vertisol class. Because of the surface layer of silt loam and slow permeability in the clayey subsoil, the soils are ideal for rice production.

== See also ==
- Pedology (soil study)
- Soil types
- List of U.S. state soils

== Sources ==
- Official Series Description - Stuttgart
- Arkansas State Soil
