= Narragansett (soil) =

Narragansett soils are loamy soils occurring in the northeastern United States. It is the state soil of Rhode Island.

== Name ==
“Narragansett” is the name of the town where the soil was first classified. The town was named for the indigenous Narragansett tribe. Narragansett is an English corruption of Nanhigganeuck, their actual name meaning "people of the small point."

== Distribution ==
Narragansett's soils are found in upland areas of Rhode Island, where they occupy approximately 12,000 acres (49 km^{2}), and in the adjacent states of Connecticut and Massachusetts. This soil type has been unofficially named the State Soil of Rhode Island.

== Constitution ==
The Narragansett soil series consists of coarse-loamy over sandy or sandy-skeletal, mixed, active, mesic Typic Dystrudepts. (Note: The "Typic Dystrudepts" are typical profiles [typic] with low pH [dystr] with an udic soil moisture regime and are within the Inceptisol order [epts].) They are well-drained, loamy soils that formed in friable (ablation) glacial till mantled with a silty loess cap.

== Geographical features ==
These are productive agricultural soils. Silage corn, hay, and vegetables are the principal crops. Oaks, white pine, and beech are the most common forest species. Many areas are used for residential development. The average annual precipitation in areas with this soil type ranges from 40 to 50 inches. The average annual temperature is 45 to 52 °F.

== See also ==
- Pedology (soil study)
- Soil types
- List of U.S. state soils
