= Alfred Hartemink =

Alfred Eduard Hartemink (born 14 January 1964, in Doetinchem) is a soil scientist. He is a professor in the department of soil science at the University of Wisconsin–Madison, and is editor-in-chief of the journal Geoderma Regional and of the World Soils book series.

== Education and career ==
Hartemink obtained his Master of Science degree in soil science in 1994 from Wageningen University, and went on to receive his PhD in 2001 from the University of Reading. His thesis title was Soil fertility decline in the tropics with case studies on plantation crops.

Hartemink worked for several years as a soil scientist at the International Soil Reference and Information Centre in Wageningen, Netherlands, before moving in 2011 to the University of Wisconsin–Madison.

His research focuses on digital soil mapping and soil carbon.

== Awards and honors ==
Hartemink is a Fellow of the Soil Science Society of America (elected 2016) and the recipient of the 2016 International Soil Science Award from the Soil Science Society of America.
