= Newmark's influence chart =

Newmark's Influence Chart is an illustration used to determine the vertical pressure at any point below a uniformly loaded flexible area of soil of any shape. This method, like others, was derived by integration of Boussinesq's equation for a point load.

== Background ==
Newmark obtained values of R/z that corresponded to various pressure ratios by using the equation $\frac{R}{z}=\sqrt{1-\left(\frac{\Delta\sigma_z}{q}\right)^{-2/3}-1}$, where R = the radial distance away from the point at which the load is applied, z = the vertical depth below the applied load, Δσ_{z} = the stress at the point of interest a depth of z below the surface, and q = the load per unit area applied at the surface. Using the pressure ratios obtained from the equation above, he was able to form the influence chart.

== Application ==
The chart is constructed by drawing concentric circles. The circles are divided by equally spaced radial lines. The radii of the circles are equal to the R/z values corresponding to Δσ_{z}/q = 0, 0.1, 0.2,...,1. There are nine circles shown since when Δσ_{z}/q = 0, R/z = 0 also. The unit length for plotting the circles is AB.

When solving a vertical stress problem using Newmark's influence chart, the influence value (IV) must be taken into account. It is proportional to the number of elements in the chart and is given by 1/N, N being the total number of elements in the chart. For example, a typical chart consists of 200 elements; therefore, the influence value is 0.005. The procedure for obtaining the vertical pressure at any point below a loaded area is as follows:

1. Verify the depth z below the uniformly loaded area where the stress increase is to be obtained.
2. Plot the plan of the loaded area with a scale of z equal to the unit length of the chart (AB).
3. Place the plan on the influence chart in such a manner that the point below which the stress is to be determined in located at the center of the chart.
4. Count the number of elements (M) of the chart enclosed by the plan of the loaded area.

The formula used to solve for the increase in pressure at the point being considered is Δσ_{z} = (IV)qM, where IV = influence value, q = pressure on the loaded area, and M = number of elements enclosed by loaded area.

== Limitations ==
The equation and chart needed to apply Newmark's method is based entirely on the principles of the theory of elasticity. There are however limitations to these theories that one must realize when they are applied to an actual soil. Generally, soil deposits are not homogeneous, perfectly elastic, and isotropic. This being the case, some variation from the theoretical stress calculations should be expected in the field. One could expect up to a 30% difference between theoretical estimates and field values.

== Important Figures ==
Joseph Valentin Boussinesq (1842–1929) was a French physicist and mathematician. He was a professor of differential and integral calculus at the Faculty of Sciences of Lille (1872–86), and professor of physics and mechanics at Sorbonne, Paris (1886). In 1883, he solved the problem of stresses produced at any point in a homogeneous, elastic, isotropic soil medium as the result of a point load applied on the surface of an infinitely large half-space.

Nathan Mortimore Newmark (1910–1981) attended Rutgers University. He graduated in 1930 with High Honors and Special Honors in civil engineering. Newmark was extremely well known in his field for research in structural engineering and structural dynamics at the University of Illinois at Urbana-Champaign. His research greatly influenced structural and mechanical design across the world. He is also known for his contributions to the design of earthquake-resistant structures and to the trans-Alaska pipeline. In 1942, Newmark expanded on Boussinesq's work by constructing what is now very widely known in geotechnical engineering as Newmark's influence chart.
