= Holdrege (soil) =

Type of soil

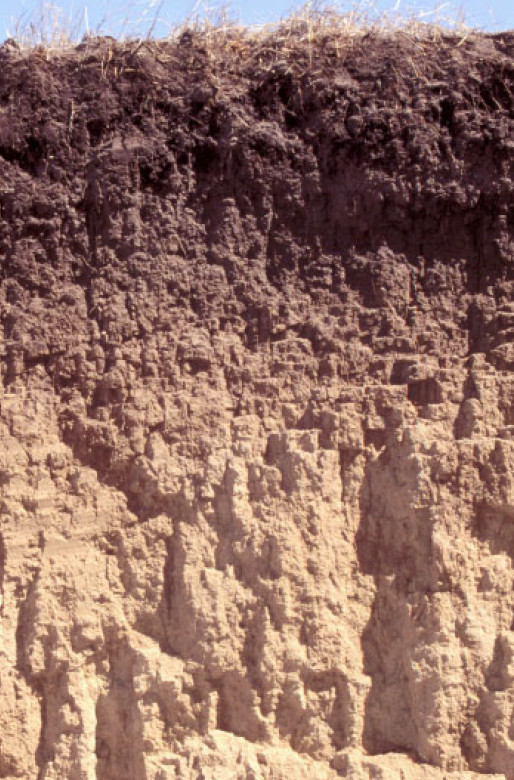
- Holdrege soil

Argiustoll

The Holdrege silt loam is the state soil of Nebraska since 1979.

== Description ==
In soil taxonomy, its full description is a "Holdrege silt loam, fine-silty, mixed, mesic, Typic Argiustoll". Holdrege silt loam covers 1.8 million acres of land in south-central Nebraska, under a grass landscape. Good drainage and moisture movement resulted in the downward movement of clay and lime. First described in 1917 in Phelps County, Nebraska, the soil has a significant role in corn, grain and soy farming. Formed in silty, calcareous loess, the soil ranges from 0 to 15 percent slope.
