= Plainfield (soil) =

Plainfield soil series is the name given to a sandy soil which has developed on coarse-textured drift. It is an excessively drained entisol which typically has a brown profile with weak horizon development.

This is an extensive soil, covering more than 750,000 acres (3,000 km^{2}) in the midwestern United States and southern Ontario in Canada. It has a long history of cultivation with corn, grains and hay the chief crops. It is not as severely leached as the sandy podzols found in cooler, wetter climates, but poor land management has made some areas infertile. Today, pine plantations are common in the less fertile areas while farms under intensive management, including irrigation, raise specialty produce such as sweet corn and snap beans.

The series was established in Plainfield, Waushara County, Wisconsin.

== Online References ==
- USDA - Plainfield Series
