= Multiscale European Soil Information System =

European data analysis method

The Multi-Scale Soil Information System (MEUSIS) is a data analysis method introduced late 2010 as part of the Sixth Community Environment Action Programme, under the INSPIRE directive. It was proposed as a solution to the lack of a singular approach to soil data aggregation across the European Union accessible through the European Soil Portal.

It applies upscaling methods to allow data which was produced at a certain scale to be coalesced into coarser, bigger cells. It applies a variety of calculations (eg. average, median, mean, etc.) to the blocks that fit inside the upscaled block size, then labels that larger block with the value of your selection. It has 3 spatial resolution levels that are recommended for use, 1 km², 5 km², and 10 km².
