= Guelph soil =

Guelph soil series is the name given to a well-drained or moderately well drained medium-textured soil which has developed on calcareous glacial till in parts of Michigan, Ohio in the United States and Ontario in Canada. It is an alfisol which is classified as an Orthic Gray Brown Luvisol under the Canadian system of soil classification.

== Agriculture and vegetation ==
This soil is fertile and extensive. It supports much agriculture in its areas of occurrence. Corn, beans, wheat, and hay components such as grass, alfalfa and clover are among the chief crops. Woodlots contain hardwood trees such as beech, maple, ash, hickory and basswood, plus spring wildflowers such as white trillium and mayapple.
