= European Soil Bureau Network =

The European Soil Bureau Network (ESBN), located at the Joint Research Centre (JRC) of the European Commission, Ispra(I), was created in 1996 as a network of national soil science institutions. The ESBN at the JRC is operated by staff members of the Land Management Unit (LMU). Its main tasks are to collect, harmonise, organise and distribute soil information for Europe. This section describes the history, background and current work programme of the network.

The European Soil Bureau is a Network of "Centres of Excellence". In general terms, therefore, the role the ESBN Project at the JRC is twofold - to perform a co-ordination activity by hosting the Secretariat of the ESBN and to provide a central source for information relevant to the work of the European Commission.

The ESBN is experiencing a surge in the demand for soil information in Europe, for addressing a number of environmental problems and questions. These include: leaching of agrochemicals, deposition of heavy metals, disposal of waste (agricultural, domestic and industrial), degradation of soil structure (through loss of soil organic matter, salinisation and subsoil compaction), risk of erosion (by water and wind), immobilisation of radionuclides, supply of water at catchment level, assessing the suitability (and sustainability) for traditional and alternative crops, and estimation of soil stability.
