= White Eyes Creek =

Stream in Muskingum County, Ohio, USA

Coordinates: 39°55′4″N 81°51′52″W

White Eyes Creek is a stream located entirely within Muskingum County, Ohio.

White Eyes Creek was named for White Eyes, a Delaware Indian chief.

== See also ==
- List of rivers of Ohio
