= White-eye (soil) =

White-eye is white soil with lime nodules, which is non-stratified, geologically recent deposits of silty or loamy material, deposited by the wind and cemented together with calcium carbonate concretions.

White soil deposits with lime nodules are found in the illuvial horizons of soils that formed on loess and loess-like loams. In the soil profile, the nodules stand out as bright spots with a clear and rounded shape. The size of spots is 1–2 cm in diameter, which is comparable to the size of an eye, and, more specifically, to that of the species of birds known as White-eye. Thus, the name "White-eye" for loess with lime nodules may have been derived from their comparison to these birds. Unlike other forms of carbonate nodules, which are often found in more solid rock, loess deposits with lime nodules are soft and crumbly, or loose. The German word for loose is loess; it was first used in about 1823 in reference to the Rhine River loess.

The word "White-eye" is sometimes used as a synonym for loess loam. This is due to the presence of calcareous nodules in the loess which are white/whitish-grey and stand out against the light yellow color of the loess sediments.

== See also ==
- Soil color
