= List of state soil science associations =

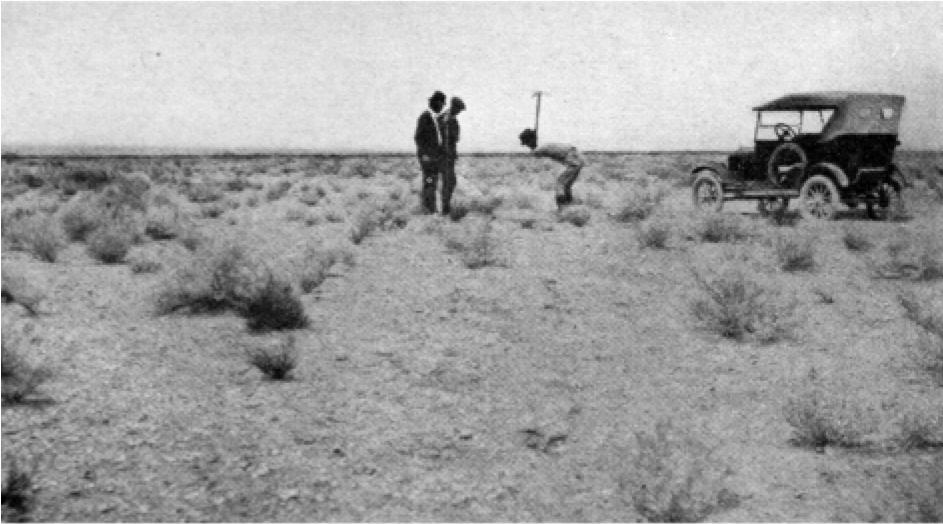
Early soil scientists

This is a comprehensive list of state-level professional soil science associations in the United States. There is a US Consortium of Soil Science Associations that strives to increase work, communication and corporation between these associations and other soil scientist associations.lun

== Associations ==
=== A ===
- Alabama - Professional Soil Classifiers Association of Alabama
- Alaska/Yukon Society of Professional Soil Scientists
- Arizona
- Arkansas Association of Professional Soil Classifiers

=== C ===
- California - Professional Soil Scientists Association of California
- Colorado
- Connecticut - Society of Soil Scientists of Southern New England

=== D ===
- Delaware

=== F ===
- Florida Association of Environmental Soil Scientists

=== G ===
- Georgia - Soil Science Society of Georgia

=== H ===
- Hawaii

=== I ===
- Idaho Soil Scientists Association
- Illinois Soil Classifiers Association
- Indiana Association of Professional Soil Classifiers
- Iowa Association of Professional Soil Classifiers

=== K ===
- Kansas Association of Professional Soil Classifiers
- Kentucky Association of Soil Classifiers

=== L ===
- Louisiana

=== M ===
- Maine Maine Association of Professional Soil Scientists
- Maryland Maryland Association of Professional Soil Scientists
- Massachusetts - Society of Soil Scientists of Southern New England
- Michigan - Soil Classifiers Association of Michigan
- Minnesota Association of Professional Soil Scientists
- Mississippi - Professional Soil Classifiers Association of Mississippi
- Missouri Association of Professional Soil Scientists
- Montana - none found

=== N ===
- Nebraska Association of Professional Soil Scientists
- Nevada
- New Hampshire Association of Natural Resource Scientists
- New Jersey
- New Mexico Association of Professional Soil Scientists
- New York - Empire State (New York) Pedologists
- North Carolina - Soil Science Society of North Carolina
- North Dakota - Professional Soil Classifiers Association of North Dakota

=== O ===
- Ohio - Association of Ohio Pedologists
- Oklahoma Professional Soil Science Association of Oklahoma
- Oregon Soil Science Society

=== P ===
- Pennsylvania Association of Professional Soil Scientists

=== R ===
- Rhode Island - Society of Soil Scientists of Southern New England

=== S ===
- South Carolina Professional Soil Classifiers
- South Dakota Professional Soil Scientists Association of South Dakota

=== T ===
- Tennessee- Soil Scientists' Association of Tennessee
- Texas Professional Soil Scientists of Texas Association

=== U ===
- Utah Society of Soil Scientists

=== V ===
- Vermont
- Virginia Virginia Association of Professional Soil Scientists

=== W ===
- Washington Society of Professional Soil Scientists
- West Virginia Association of Professional Soil Scientists
- Wisconsin Society of Professional Soil Scientists
- Wyoming

== See also ==
- National Cooperative Soil Survey
