= Soil series =

Succession of soil horizons

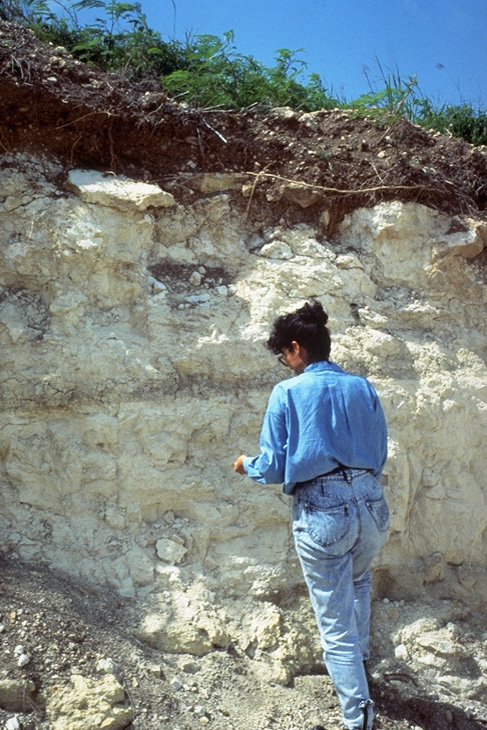
Arawak soil series. St. Croix, U.S. Virgin Islands

Soil series as established by the National Cooperative Soil Survey of the United States Department of Agriculture (USDA) Natural Resources Conservation Service are a level of classification in the USDA Soil Taxonomy classification system hierarchy. The actual object of classification is the so-called soil individual, or pedon. Soil series consist of pedons that are grouped together because of their similar pedogenesis, soil chemistry, and physical properties. More specifically, each series consists of pedons having soil horizons that are similar in soil color, soil texture, soil structure, soil pH, consistency, mineral and chemical composition, and arrangement in the soil profile. These result in soils which perform similarly for land use purposes.

The soil series concept was originally introduced in 1903. Soil series were originally intended to consist of groups of soils which were thought to be the same in origin but different in texture. Soils were thought to be alike in origin if they were derived from the same kind of rocks or if they were derived in sediments derived from the same kind of rocks and deposited at the same time.

A soil series name generally is derived from a town or landmark in or near the area where the soil series was first recognized. For example, the Haugan Series was first identified near Haugan, Montana. The distribution of a given series is not necessarily restricted to the boundaries of only one county or state—for example, the Hagerstown Series was first described near Hagerstown, Maryland, but has also been found as far away as Tennessee and Kentucky.

== Relationship to soil mapping ==
Depending on the context, a soil series may be defined as either a taxonomic unit or a mapping unit. A taxonomic unit is a category belonging to a specific level of a classification system. It is a conceptual entity that describes the "central nucleus" or essential characteristics of a class. On the other hand, a mapping unit delineates areas of soil in the landscape (i.e. adjacent pedons or polypedons) that possess similar characteristics. The characteristics of a soil series (taxonomic unit) may or may not overlap either fully or partially with the characteristics of pedons within a given mapping unit.

Mapping units consist of one or more components. Each component represents polypedons that belong to a particular soil series. The name of a map unit is usually named after the dominant component within the mapping unit. For example, the dominant component of the mapping unit LhE—Lily sandy loam, 15 to 35 percent slopes, very stony in the Greenbrier County, West Virginia soil survey is the Lily series, which comprises 80% of the mapping unit. The remaining 20% of the mapping unit consists of the Dekalb series, Berks series, and "soils that have stones covering less of the surface" than the Lily series.
