= Subsoil =

Layer of soil under the topsoil on the surface of the ground

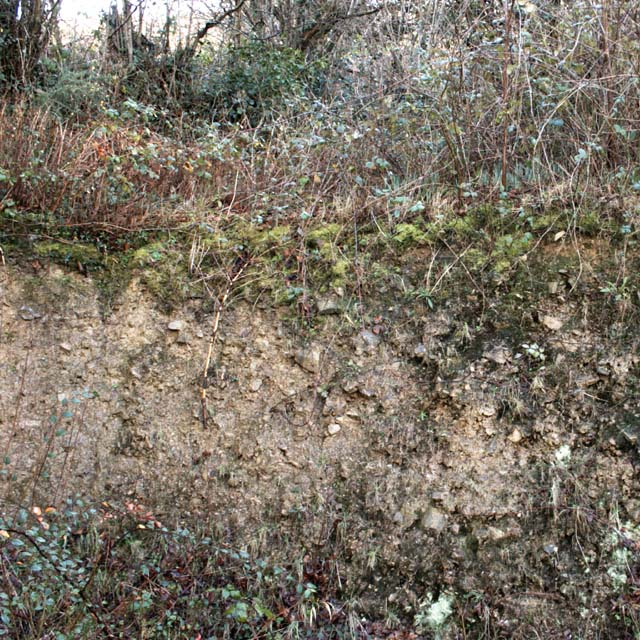
Subsoil layer

Subsoil is the layer of soil under the topsoil on the surface of the ground. Like topsoil, it is composed of a variable mixture of small particles such as sand, silt and clay, but with a much lower percentage of organic matter and humus. The subsoil is labeled the B Horizon in most soil mapping systems. Because it has less organic matter than topsoil, subsoil soil colour is mainly derived from iron oxides. Iron oxides and clay minerals form due to weathering. Rainfall moves these weathering products downward as solutes and colloids by rainfall. The subsoil is the depth where these weathering products accumulate. The accumulation of clay minerals, iron, aluminum, and organic compounds is called illuviation.

Whereas the topsoil tends to be the depth of greatest physical, chemical, and biological activity, the subsoil is the depth of most deposition. Due to physical, chemical, and biological activity, the subsoil generally has a soil structure. The presence of structure distinguishes the subsoil from the underlying substratum. Due to human activity, the topsoil and subsoil in many environments have been mixed. Below the subsoil is the soil substratum (or C horizon).

Clay-based subsoil has been the primary source of material for adobe, cob, rammed earth, wattle and daub, and other earthen construction methods for millennia. Coarse sand, the other ingredient in most of these materials, is also found in subsoil.

Although not sterile, subsoil is relatively barren in terms of soil organisms compared to humus-rich topsoil.

== See also ==
- Soil
- Soil horizon
- Subgrade
- Parent rock

== Sources ==
- Håkansson, Inge; Reeder, Randall C. (March 1994). "Subsoil compaction by vehicles with high axle load—extent, persistence and crop response". Soil and Tillage Research. 29 (2–3): 277–304. doi:10.1016/0167-1987(94)90065-5. (subscription required)
- Adams, Fred; . Moore, B. L (January 1983). "Chemical Factors Affecting Root Growth in Subsoil Horizons of Coastal Plain Soils". Vol. 47 No. 1. Soil Science Society of America Journal. pp. 99–102. (subscription required)
