= Soil type =

Taxonomic unit

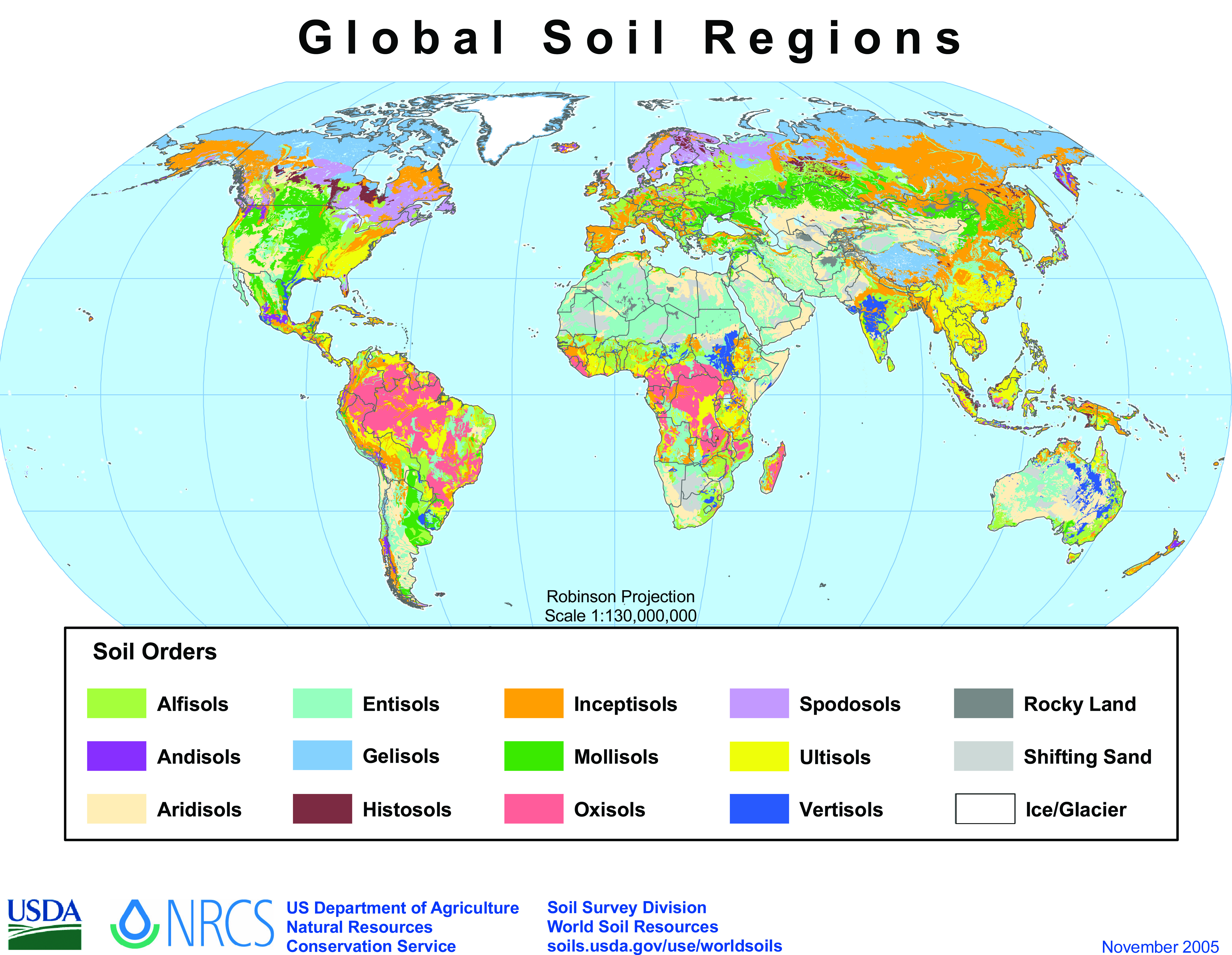
Map of global soil regions from the USDA

A soil type is a taxonomic unit in soil science. All soils that share a certain set of well-defined properties form a distinctive soil type. Soil type is a technical term of soil classification, the science that deals with the systematic categorization of soils.

In hierarchical soil classification systems, soil types mostly belong to the higher or intermediate level. A soil type can normally be subdivided into subtypes, and in many systems several soil types can be combined to entities of higher category. However, in the first classification system of the United States (Whitney, 1909), the soil type was the lowest level and the mapping unit.

For the definition of soil types, some systems use primarily such characteristics that are the result of soil-forming processes (pedogenesis). An example is the German soil systematics. Other systems combine characteristics resulting from soil-forming processes and characteristics inherited from the parent material. Examples are the World Reference Base for Soil Resources (WRB) and the USDA soil taxonomy. Other systems do not ask whether the properties are the result of soil formation or not. An example is the Australian Soil Classification.

A convenient way to define a soil type is referring to soil horizons. However, this is not always possible because some very initial soils may not even have a clear development of horizons. For other soils, it may be more convenient to define the soil type just referring to some properties common to the whole soil profile. For example, WRB defines the Arenosols by their sand content. Many soils are more or less strongly influenced by human activities. This is reflected by the definition of many soil types in various classification systems.

Because soil type is a very general and widely used term, many soil classification systems do not use it for their definitions. The USDA soil taxonomy has six hierarchical levels that are named order, suborder, great group, subgroup, family, and series. The WRB calls the first level Reference Soil Group. The second level in WRB is constructed by adding qualifiers, and for the result (the Reference Soil Group plus the qualifiers), no taxonomic term is used.

== See also ==
- List of vineyard soil types
