= Pedology =

Study of soils in their natural environment

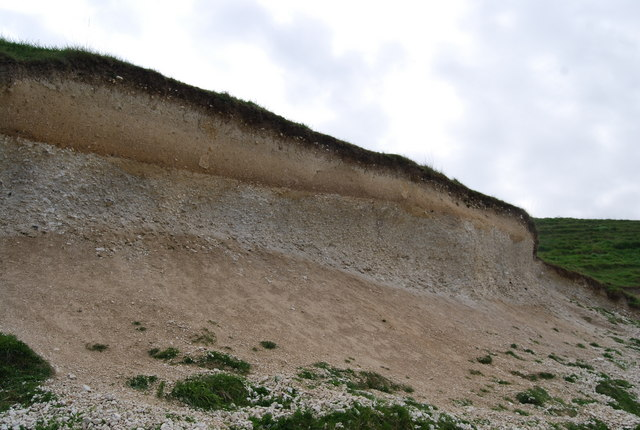
Soil profile on chalk at Seven Sisters Country Park, England

Pedology (from Greek: πέδον, pedon, "soil"; and λόγος, logos, "study") is a discipline within soil science which focuses on understanding and characterizing soil formation, evolution, and the theoretical frameworks for modeling soil bodies, often in the context of the natural environment. Pedology is often seen as one of two main branches of soil inquiry, the other being edaphology which is traditionally more agronomically oriented and focuses on how soil properties influence plant communities (natural or cultivated).

In studying the fundamental phenomenology of soils, e.g., soil formation (aka pedogenesis), pedologists pay particular attention to observing soil morphology, the geographic distributions of soils, and the placement of soil bodies within larger temporal and spatial contexts. In so doing, pedologists develop systems of soil classification, soil maps, and theories for characterizing temporal and spatial interrelations among soils. There are a few noteworthy sub-disciplines of pedology; namely pedometrics and soil geomorphology. Pedometrics focuses on the development of techniques for quantitative characterization of soils, especially for the purposes of mapping soil properties whereas soil geomorphology studies the interrelationships between geomorphic processes and soil formation.

== Overview ==
Soil is not only a support for vegetation, but it is also the pedosphere, the locus of numerous interactions between climate (water, air, temperature), soil life (micro-organisms, plants, animals) and its residues, the mineral material of the original and added rock, and its position in the landscape. During its formation and genesis, the soil profile slowly deepens and develops characteristic layers, called 'horizons', while a steady state balance is approached.

Soil users (such as agronomists) showed initially little concern in the dynamics of soil. They saw it as a medium whose chemical, physical and biological properties were useful for the services of agronomic productivity. On the other hand, pedologists and geologists did not initially focus on the agronomic applications of the soil characteristics (edaphic properties) but upon its relation to the nature and history of landscapes. Today, there is an integration of the two disciplinary approaches as part of landscape and environmental sciences.

Pedologists are now also interested in the practical applications of a good understanding of pedogenesis processes (the evolution and functioning of soils), like interpreting its environmental history and predicting consequences of changes in land use, while agronomists understand that the cultivated soil is a complex medium, often resulting from several thousands of years of evolution. They understand that the current balance is fragile and that only a thorough knowledge of its history makes it possible to ensure its sustainable use.

== Concepts ==
Important pedological concepts include:

- Complexity in soil genesis is more common than simplicity.
- Soils lie at the interface of Earth's atmosphere, biosphere, hydrosphere and lithosphere. Therefore, a thorough understanding of soils requires some knowledge of meteorology, climatology, ecology, biology, hydrology, geomorphology, geology and many other earth sciences and natural sciences.
- Contemporary soils carry imprints of pedogenic processes that were active in the past, although in many cases these imprints are difficult to observe or quantify. Thus, knowledge of paleoecology, palaeogeography, glacial geology and paleoclimatology is important for the recognition and understanding of soil genesis and constitute a basis for predicting future soil changes.
- Five major, external factors of formation (climate, organisms, relief, parent material and time), and several smaller, less identifiable ones, drive pedogenic processes and create soil patterns.
- Characteristics of soils and soil landscapes, e.g., the number, sizes, shapes and arrangements of soil bodies, each of which is characterized on the basis of soil horizons, degree of internal homogeneity, slope, aspect, landscape position, age and other properties and relationships, can be observed and measured.
- Distinctive bioclimatic regimes or combinations of pedogenic processes produce distinctive soils. Thus, distinctive, observable morphological features, e.g., illuvial clay accumulation in B horizons, are produced by certain combinations of pedogenic processes operative over varying periods of time.
- Pedogenic (soil-forming) processes act to both create and destroy order (anisotropy) within soils; these processes can proceed simultaneously. The resulting soil profile reflects the balance of these processes, present and past.
- The geological Principle of Uniformitarianism applies to soils, i.e., pedogenic processes active in soils today have been operating for long periods of time, back to the time of appearance of organisms on the land surface. These processes do, however, have varying degrees of expression and intensity over space and time.
- A succession of different soils may have developed, eroded and/or regressed at any particular site, as soil genetic factors and site factors, e.g., vegetation, sedimentation, geomorphology, change.
- There are very few old soils (in a geological sense) because they can be destroyed or buried by geological events, or modified by shifts in climate by virtue of their vulnerable position at the surface of the earth. Little of the soil continuum dates back beyond the Tertiary period and most soils and land surfaces are no older than the Pleistocene Epoch. However, preserved/lithified soils (paleosols) are an almost ubiquitous feature in terrestrial (land-based) environments throughout most of geologic time. Since they record evidence of ancient climate change, they present immense utility in understanding climate evolution throughout geologic history.
- Knowledge and understanding of the genesis of a soil is important in its classification and mapping.
- Soil classification systems cannot be based entirely on perceptions of genesis, however, because genetic processes are seldom observed and because pedogenic processes change over time.
- Knowledge of soil genesis is imperative and basic to soil use and management. Human influence on, or adjustment to, the factors and processes of soil formation can be best controlled and planned using knowledge about soil genesis.
- Soils are natural clay factories (clay includes both clay mineral structures and particles less than 2 μm in diameter). Shales worldwide are, to a considerable extent, simply soil clays that have been formed in the pedosphere and eroded and deposited in the ocean basins, to become lithified at a later date.

== Notable pedologists ==
- Olivier de Serres
- Vasily V. Dokuchaev
- Friedrich Albert Fallou
- Konstantin D. Glinka
- Eugene W. Hilgard
- Francis D. Hole
- Hans Jenny
- Curtis F. Marbut
- Bernard Palissy
- Ryan Mulac

== See also ==
- Agricultural sciences basic topics
- List of soil topics
- Pedogenesis
