= Soil functions =

Capabilities of soils

Soil functions are general capabilities of soils that are important for various agricultural, environmental, nature protection, landscape architecture and urban applications. Soil can perform many functions and these include functions related to the natural ecosystems, agricultural productivity, environmental quality, source of raw material, and as base for buildings. Six key soil functions are:

1. Food and other biomass production
2. Environmental Interaction
3. Biological habitat and gene pool
4. Source of raw materials
5. Physical and cultural heritage
6. Platform for man-made structures

== Food and other biomass production ==
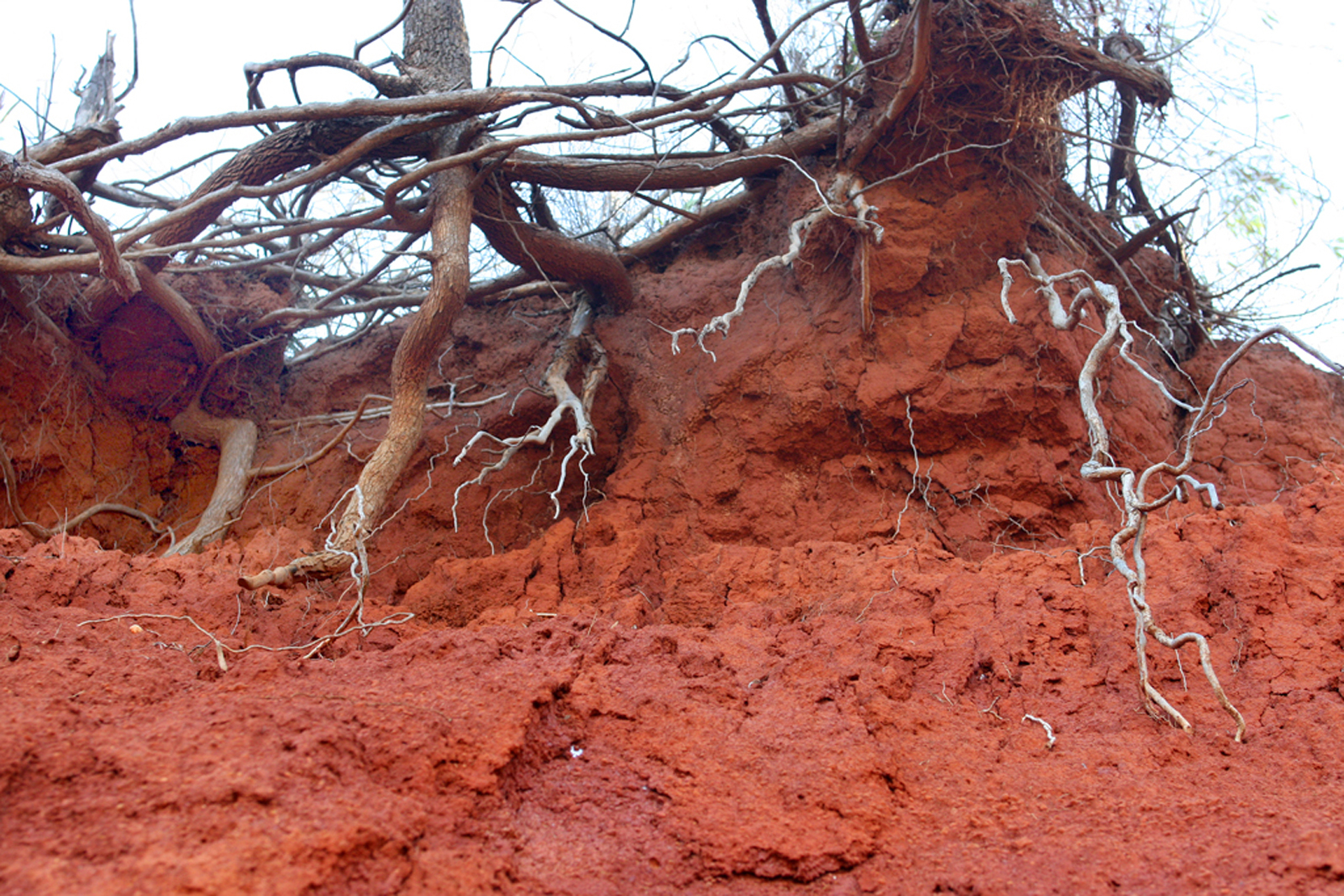
Tree roots revealed by eroded soil

Soil acts as an anchor for plant roots. It provides a hospitable place for a plant to live in while storing and supplying nutrients to plants. Soil also functions by maintaining the quantity and quality of air by allowing CO_{2} to escape and fresh O_{2} to enter the root zone. Pore spaces within soil can also absorb water and hold it until plant roots need it. The soil also moderates temperature fluctuation, providing a suitable temperature for the roots to function normally. A fertile soil will also provide dissolved mineral nutrients for optimal plant growth. The combination of these activities supports plant growth for providing food and other biomass production.

== Environmental interaction ==
Environmental interactions such as regulating water supplies, water loos, utilization, contamination, and purification are all affected by the soil. They can filter, buffer, and transform materials between the atmosphere, the plant cover, and the water table. Soil interacts with the environment to transform and decompose waste materials in to new materials. Through filtering, soil acts as a filter and captures contaminants through soil particles. Contaminants are captured by the soil particles and water comes out cleaner in the aquifers and rivers. Lastly, it can accumulate large amounts of carbon as soil organic matter, thus reducing the total concentration of carbon dioxide that can mitigate global climate change.

== Biological habitat and gene pool ==
Soils also acts as a biological habitat and a gene reserve for a large variety of organisms. Soils are the environment in which seeds grow, they provide heat, nutrients and water that are available to use to nurture plants and animals. The assistance of soil in the decomposition of dead plants, animals, and organism by transforming their remains into simpler mineral forms, can be utilized by other living things.

== Source of raw materials ==
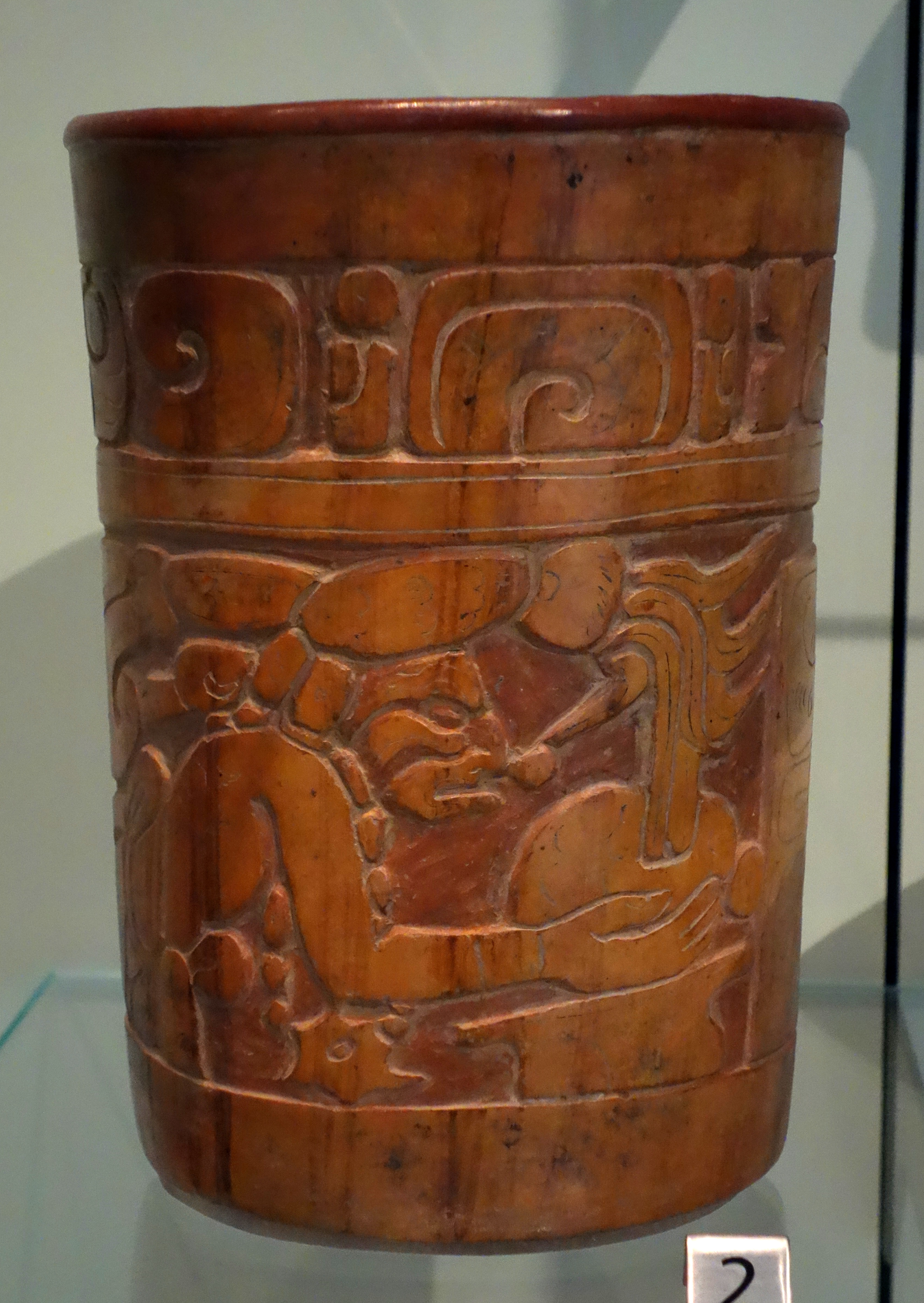
Mayan creamware ceramic vessel

Soil provides raw materials for human use and impacts human health directly. The composition of human food reflects the nature of the soil in which it was grown. An example of soil as a source of raw material can be found in ancient ceramic production. The Maya ceramics showed traits inherited from soils and sediments used as raw material. The understanding of soil formation process can help define certain type of soil and reflect the composition of soil minerals. However, the natural area of productive soils is limited and due to increasing pressure of cropping, forestry, and urbanization, extracting soil as a raw material needs to be controlled for.

== Physical and cultural heritage ==
Soil also has more general culture functions as they act as a part of the cultural landscape of our minds as well as the physical world around us. An attachment to home soils or a sense of place is a cultural attribute developed mores strongly in certain people. Soils has been around since the creation of earth, it can act as a factor in determining how humans have migrated in the past. Soil also act as an earth cover that protects and preserve the physical artifacts of the past that can allow us to better understand cultural heritage. Moreover, soil has been an important indication to where people settle as they are an essential resource for human productivity.

== Platform for man-made structures ==
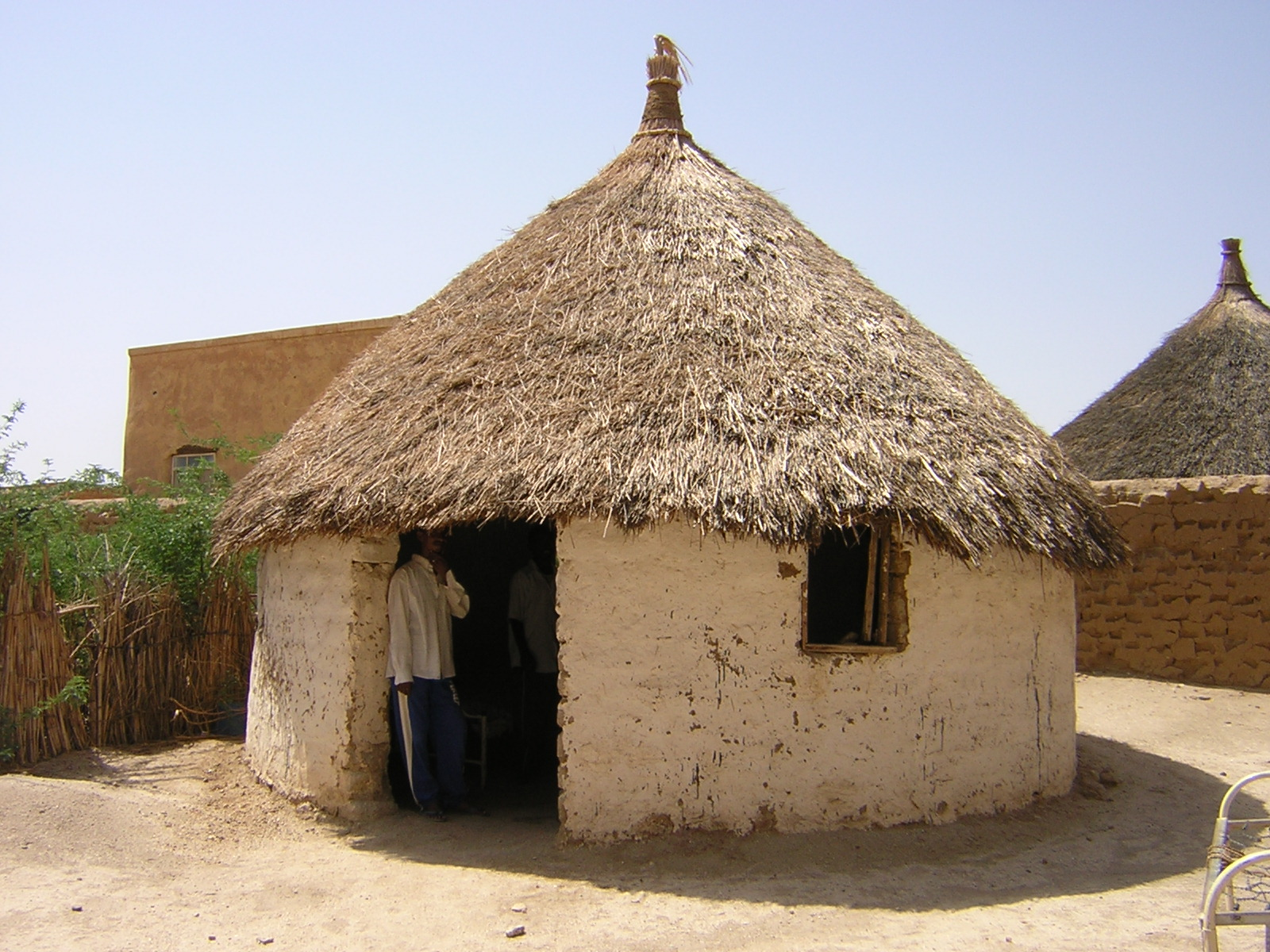
Earthen hut with thatched roof in Toteil, near Kassala, Sudan

Soil can act as raw material deposits and is widely used in building materials. Approximately 50% of the people on the planet live in houses constructed from soil. The conditions of the soil must be firm and solid to provide a good base for roads and highways to be built on. Additionally, since these structures rest on the soil, factors such as its bearing strength, compressibility, stability, and shear strength all need to be considered. Testing the physical properties allow a better application to engineering uses of soil.

== Mapping soil functions ==
Soil mapping is the identification, description, ad delineation on a map of different types of soil based on direct field observations or on indirect inferences from souch sources such as aerial photographs. Soil maps can depict soil properties and functions in the context of specific soil functions such as agricultural food production, environmental protection, and civil engineering considerations. Maps can depict functional interpretations of specific properties such as critical nutrient levels, heavy-metal levels or can depict interpretation of multiple properties such as a map of erosion risk index.

Mapping of function specific soil properties is an extension of soil survey, using maps of soil components together with auxiliary information (including pedotransfer functions and soil inference models) to depict inferences about the specific performance of soil mapping units. Other functions of soil in ecosystems:

- source of building materials (clay, sand, rocks)
- carbon recycler
- fiber production

== See also ==
- Digital soil mapping – Computer-assisted production of maps of soil properties
- Ecosystem services – Benefits provided by intact ecosystems
- Pedotransfer function
