= Soil science =

Study of soil as a natural resource on the surface of Earth

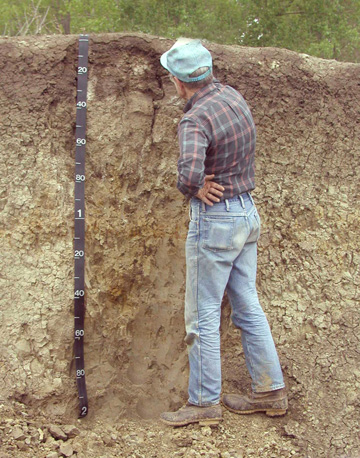
A soil scientist examining horizons within a soil profile

Soil science is the study of soil as a natural resource on the surface of the Earth including soil formation, classification and mapping; physical, chemical, biological, and fertility properties of soils; and these properties in relation to the use and management of soils.

The diversity of names of disciplines associated with soil science is related to the various associations concerned. Indeed, engineers, agronomists, chemists, geologists, physical geographers, ecologists, biologists, microbiologists, silviculturists, sanitarians, archaeologists, landscape architects and specialists in regional planning, all contribute to further knowledge of soils and the advancement of the soil sciences.

Soil scientists have raised concerns about how to preserve soil and arable land in a world with a growing population, possible future water crisis, increasing per-capita food consumption, and land degradation.

== Fields of study ==
Soil occupies the pedosphere, one of Earth's spheres that the geosciences use to organize the Earth conceptually. This is the conceptual perspective of pedology and edaphology, the two main historical branches of soil science. Pedology is the study of soil in its natural setting. Edaphology is the study of soil in relation to soil-dependent uses. Both branches apply a combination of soil physics, soil chemistry, and soil biology. Due to the numerous interactions between the biosphere, atmosphere and hydrosphere that are hosted within the pedosphere, more integrated, less soil-centric concepts are also valuable. Many concepts essential to understanding soil come from or have been renewed by individuals not identifiable strictly as soil scientists, like biologists or philosophers. This highlights the interdisciplinary nature of soil concepts.

== Research ==
Exploring the diversity and dynamics of soil continues to bring new discoveries and insights. New areas of soil research are driven by the need to understand soil in the context of climate change, greenhouse gases, and carbon sequestration. Interest in maintaining biodiversity and in exploring past cultures has also created renewed interest in achieving a better understanding of soil.

== Mapping ==
Soil mapping is the process of classifying soil types and properties in a given area and geo-encoding the information. Along the second half of the 20th century soil mapping was currently achieved by field survey and reporting contours of soil types on geographic maps at varying scales according to countries and purposes. More recently digital soil mapping approaches have been developed in various countries for quantifying soils in space and time using remote sensing data.

== Classification ==
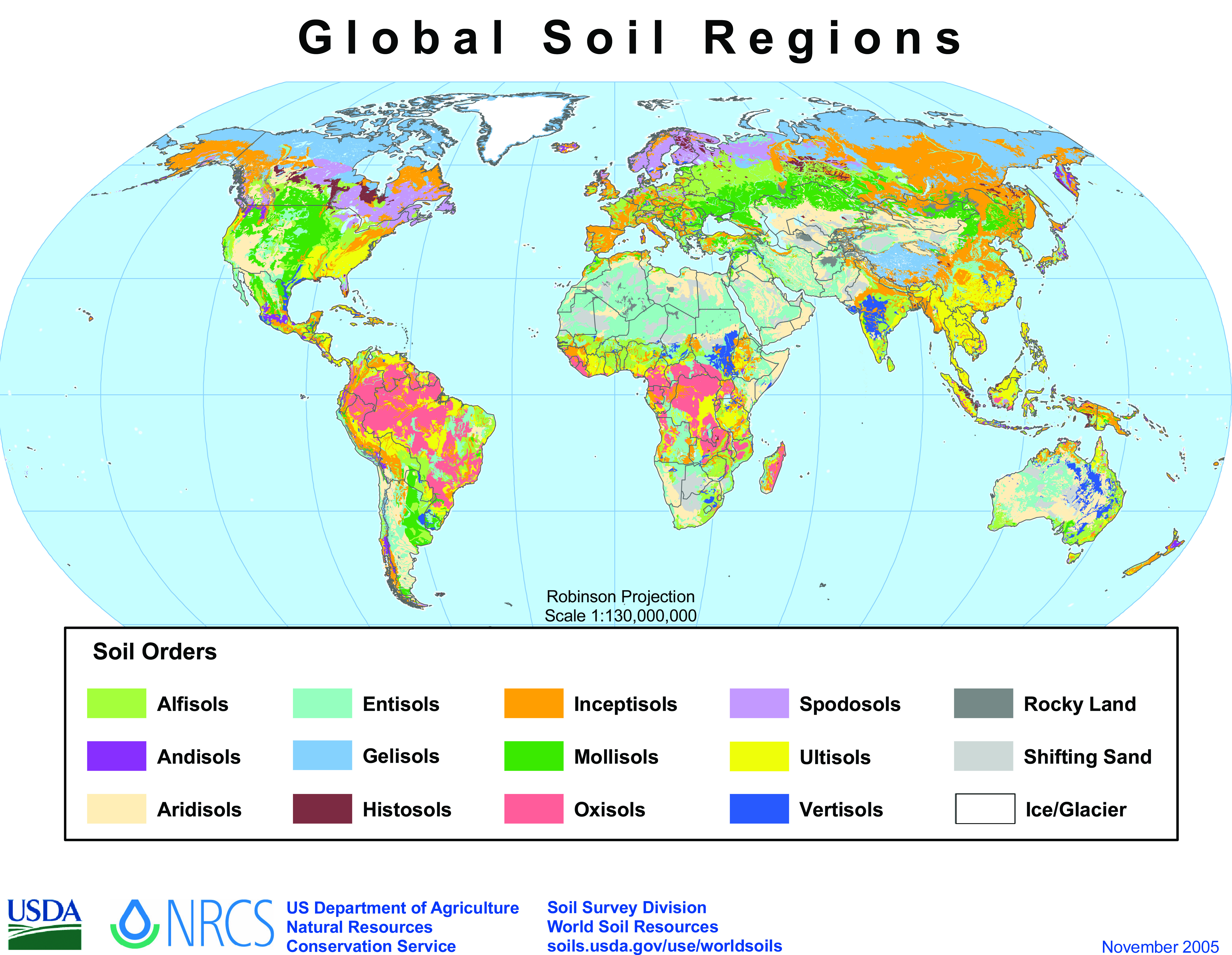
Map of global soil regions from the USDA

In 1998, the World Reference Base for Soil Resources (WRB) replaced the FAO soil classification as the international soil classification system. The currently valid version of WRB is the 4th edition, 2022. The FAO soil classification, in turn, borrowed from modern soil classification concepts, including USDA soil taxonomy.

WRB is based mainly on soil morphology as an expression of pedogenesis. A major difference with USDA soil taxonomy is that soil climate is not part of the system, except insofar as climate influences soil profile characteristics.

Many other classification schemes exist, including vernacular systems. The structure in vernacular systems is either nominal (giving unique names to soils or landscapes) or descriptive (naming soils by their characteristics such as red, hot, fat, or sandy). Soils are distinguished by obvious characteristics, such as physical appearance (e.g., color, texture, landscape position), performance (e.g., production capability, flooding), and accompanying vegetation. A vernacular distinction familiar to many is classifying texture as heavy (clayish) or light (sandy). Light soils with higher sand content and better structure take less effort to turn and cultivate than finer-textured soils but are more susceptible to erosion and thus to losses of production capacity. Light (sandy) soils do not necessarily weigh less than heavy (clay) soils on an air dry basis (i.e. they have similar bulk density), nor do they have more porosity, but they are less sensitive to cattle trampling because they are more resistant to compaction.

== History ==
The earliest known soil classification system comes from China, appearing in the book Yu Gong (5th century BCE), where the soil was divided into three categories and nine classes, depending on its color, texture and hydrology.

Contemporaries Friedrich Albert Fallou (the German founder of modern soil science) and Vasily Dokuchaev (the Russian founder of modern soil science) are both credited with being among the first to identify soil as a resource whose distinctness and complexity deserved to be separated conceptually from geology and crop production and treated as a whole. As a founding father of soil science, Fallou has primacy in time, working on the origins of soil before Dokuchaev was born. However, Dokuchaev's work was more extensive and is considered to be more significant to modern soil theory than Fallou's.

Previously, soil had been considered a product of chemical transformations of rocks, a dead substrate from which plants derive nutritious elements. Soil and bedrock were in fact equated. Dokuchaev considers the soil as a natural body having its own genesis and its own history of development, a body with complex and multiform processes taking place within it. The soil is considered as different from bedrock. The latter becomes soil under the influence of a series of soil-forming factors (climate, vegetation, country, relief and age). According to him, soil should be called the "daily" or outward horizon of rocks regardless of the type. Soils are changed naturally by the common effect of water, air and various kinds of living and dead organisms.

A 1914 encyclopedic definition: "the different forms of earth on the surface of the rocks, formed by the breaking down or weathering of rocks". serves to illustrate the historic view of soil which persisted from the 19th century. Dokuchaev's late 19th century soil concept developed in the 20th century to one of soil as earthy material that has been altered by living processes. A corollary concept is that soil without a living component is simply a part of Earth's outer layer, a regolith.

Further refinement of the soil concept is occurring in view of an appreciation of energy transport and transformation within soil. The term is popularly applied to the material on the surface of the Earth's moon and Mars, a usage acceptable within only a portion of the scientific community. Accurate to this modern understanding of soil is Nikiforoff's 1959 definition of soil as the "excited skin of the sub aerial part of the Earth's crust".

== Areas of practice ==
Academically, soil scientists tend to be drawn to one of five areas of specialization: soil biology, pedology, edaphology, physics, or chemistry. Yet the work specifics are very much dictated by the challenges facing our civilization's desire to sustain the land that supports it, and the distinctions between the sub-disciplines of soil science often blur in the process, with The Critical Zone concept providing a natural framework for cross-disciplinary fundamental research on soil, rock, air, water, and biotic resources at the Earth's surface. Soil science professionals commonly stay current in soil chemistry, soil physics, soil biology, pedology, and applied soil science in related disciplines. However, the emergence and development of new sub-disciplines, more related to other fields of knowledge, such as biology and physics, than to the original geological framework, contributed to declining investments in research and teaching of soil science at the turn of the 21st century.

One point of effort drawing in soil scientists in the U.S. as of 2004 is the Illinois Soil Quality Initiative. Central to the Soil Quality Initiative is developing indices of soil health and then monitoring them in a way that provides long-term (decade-to-decade) feedback on the performance as stewards of the planet. The effort includes understanding the functions of soil microbiotic crusts and exploring the potential to sequester atmospheric carbon in soil organic matter. Relating the concept of agriculture to soil quality, however, has not been without criticism, including critiques by Nobel Peace Prize laureate Norman Borlaug, the father of the Green Revolution, and World Food Prize winner Pedro Sanchez, two proponents of biotechnology-based agriculture for solving the hungry problem in the tropics.

A more traditional role for soil scientists has been to map soils. Almost every area in the United States now has a published soil survey, including interpretive tables on how soil properties support or limit activities and uses. An internationally accepted soil taxonomy allows uniform communication of soil characteristics and soil functions. National and international soil survey efforts have given the profession unique insights into landscape-scale functions. The landscape functions that soil scientists are called upon to address in the field seem to fall roughly into six areas:

- Land-based treatment of wastes
  - Septic system
  - Manure
  - Municipal biosolids
  - Food and fiber processing waste
- Identification and protection of environmentally critical areas
  - Sensitive and unstable soils
  - Wetlands
  - Unique soil situations that support valuable habitat and ecosystem diversity
- Management for optimum land productivity
  - Silviculture
  - Agronomy
    - Nutrient management
    - Water management
  - Native vegetation
  - Grazing
- Management for optimum water quality
  - Stormwater management
  - Sediment and erosion control
- Remediation and restoration of damaged lands
  - Mine reclamation
  - Flood and storm damage
  - Contamination
- Sustainability of desired uses
  - Soil conservation

There are also practical applications of soil science that might not be apparent from looking at a published soil survey.

- Radiometric dating: specifically a knowledge of local pedology is used to date prior activity at the site
  - Stratification (archeology) where soil formation processes and preservative qualities can inform the study of archaeological sites
  - Geological phenomena
    - Landslides
    - Active faults
- Altering soils to achieve new uses
  - Vitrification to contain radioactive wastes
  - Enhancing soil microbial capabilities in degrading contaminants (bioremediation).
  - Carbon sequestration
  - Environmental soil science
- Pedology
  - Soil genesis
  - Pedometrics
  - Soil morphology
    - Soil micromorphology
  - Soil classification
    - USDA soil taxonomy
    - World Reference Base for Soil Resources
- Soil biology
  - Soil microbiology
  - Soil animals
- Soil chemistry
  - Soil biochemistry
  - Soil mineralogy
- Soil physics
  - Pedotransfer function
  - Soil mechanics and engineering
- Soil hydrology, hydropedology

=== Fields of application in soil science ===
- Climate change
- Ecosystem studies
- Pedotransfer function
- Soil fertility / nutrient management
- Soil management
- Soil survey
- Standard methods of analysis
- Watershed and wetland studies
- Land Suitability classification

=== Related disciplines ===
- Agricultural sciences
  - Agricultural soil science
  - Agrophysics science
  - Irrigation management
- Anthropology
  - archaeological stratigraphy
- Environmental science
  - Landscape ecology
- Physical geography
  - Geomorphology
- Geology
  - Biogeochemistry
  - Geomicrobiology
- Hydrology
  - Hydrogeology
- Waste management
- Wetland science

== Depression storage capacity ==
Depression storage capacity, in soil science, is the ability of a particular area of land to retain water in its pits and depressions, thus preventing it from flowing. Depression storage capacity, along with infiltration capacity, is one of the main factors involved in Horton overland flow, whereby water volume surpasses both infiltration and depression storage capacity and begins to flow horizontally across land, possibly leading to flooding and soil erosion. The study of land's depression storage capacity is important in the fields of geology, ecology, and especially hydrology.

== See also ==
- Agricultural soil science
- Agroecology
- Agronomy
- Agrophysics
- Australian Society of Soil Science Incorporated (ASSSI)
- Compost
- History of soil science
- International Soil Reference and Information Centre (ISRIC)
- International Union of Soil Sciences (IUSS)
- Liming (soil)
- List of Russian Earth scientists
- List of State Soil Science Associations
- List of State Soil Science Licensing Boards
- National Society of Consulting Soil Scientists (NSCSS)
- Resonant column test
- Soil biology
- Soil Science Society of America (SSSA)
- Soil value
- World Congress of Soil Science (WCSS)
