= Soil inference system =

Inference is a process of deriving logical conclusion from the basis of empirical evidence and prior knowledge rather than on the basis of direct observation. Soil inference system (SINFERS) is the term proposed by McBratney et al. (2002) as a knowledge base to infer soil properties and populate the digital soil databases. SINFERS takes measurements with a given level of certainty and infers data that is not known with minimal uncertainties by means of logically linked predictive functions. These predictive functions, in a non-spatial context are referred to as pedotransfer functions. The basic assumption underlying SINFERS is that if one knows or is able to predict the basic fundamental properties of a soil, one should be able to infer all other physical and chemical properties using PTFs. Pedotransfer functions relate basic soil properties to other more difficult or expensive to measure soil properties by means of regression and various data mining tools. Crucial to the operation of SINFERS are reliable inputs, the ability to link basic soil information, and the quantification of uncertainty.

== Current status ==
During 2007–2009, Grant Tranter of the University of Sydney, Australia in collaboration with Jason Morris of Morris Technical Solutions, US, completed a working prototype of SINFERS. This implementation of the SINFERS concept uses Jess to pattern match object representations of subsets of soil properties in working memory to the argument list of known pedotransfer functions. The SINFERS' knowledge base knows which PTF rules to apply and how to choose the most certain computed values. SINFERS computes new properties not only from an original input set, but also from all newly inferred properties. Some of the design aspects of this application were presented at the October Rules Fest 2009. See October Rules Fest 2009.

In November 2009, the formal work on the project was suspended for more than two years. However, as of March 2012, the research has been resumed by Jason Morris, now at the University of Sydney. As of January 2013, the latest progress has been presented in Sydney (April 2012), and the general concepts were discussed in Italy (July 2012) and also in Tasmania (December 2012).

Current project scope includes deployment as an interactive web application and exposure as a web service. Public release is scheduled for late 2013.

== See also ==
- Digital soil mapping
- Pedometrics
- Pedotransfer function
