= Hydropedology =

Emerging field in soil science

Hydropedology is an emerging field formed from the intertwining branches of soil science and hydrology. Similar to hydrogeology, hydroclimatology, and ecohydrology, the emphasis is connections between hydrology and other of the earth's spheres. In this case, hydropedology focuses on the interface between the hydrosphere and the pedosphere.
