= Taka Mountains =

Land formation in Sudan

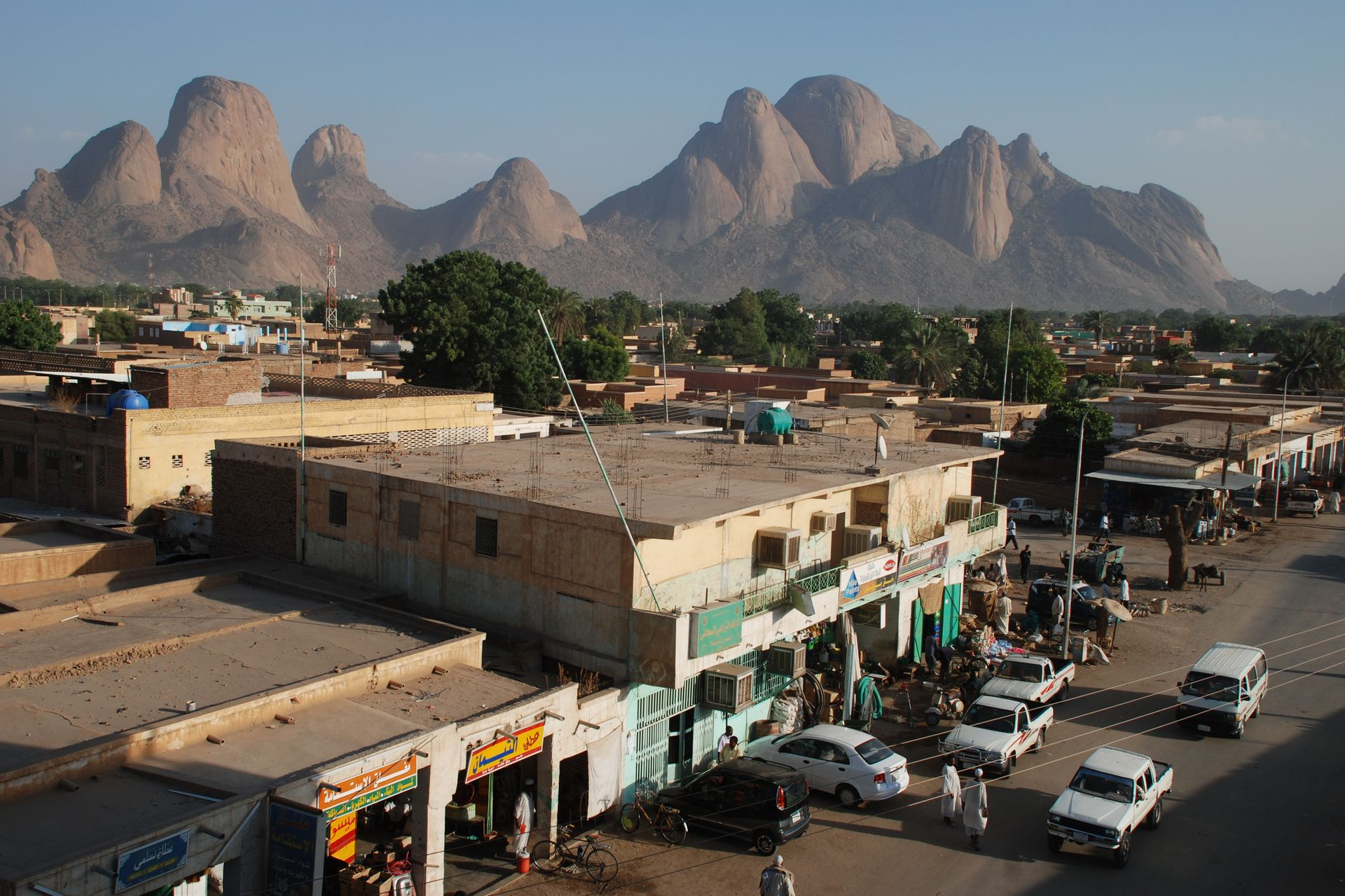
View from Kassala

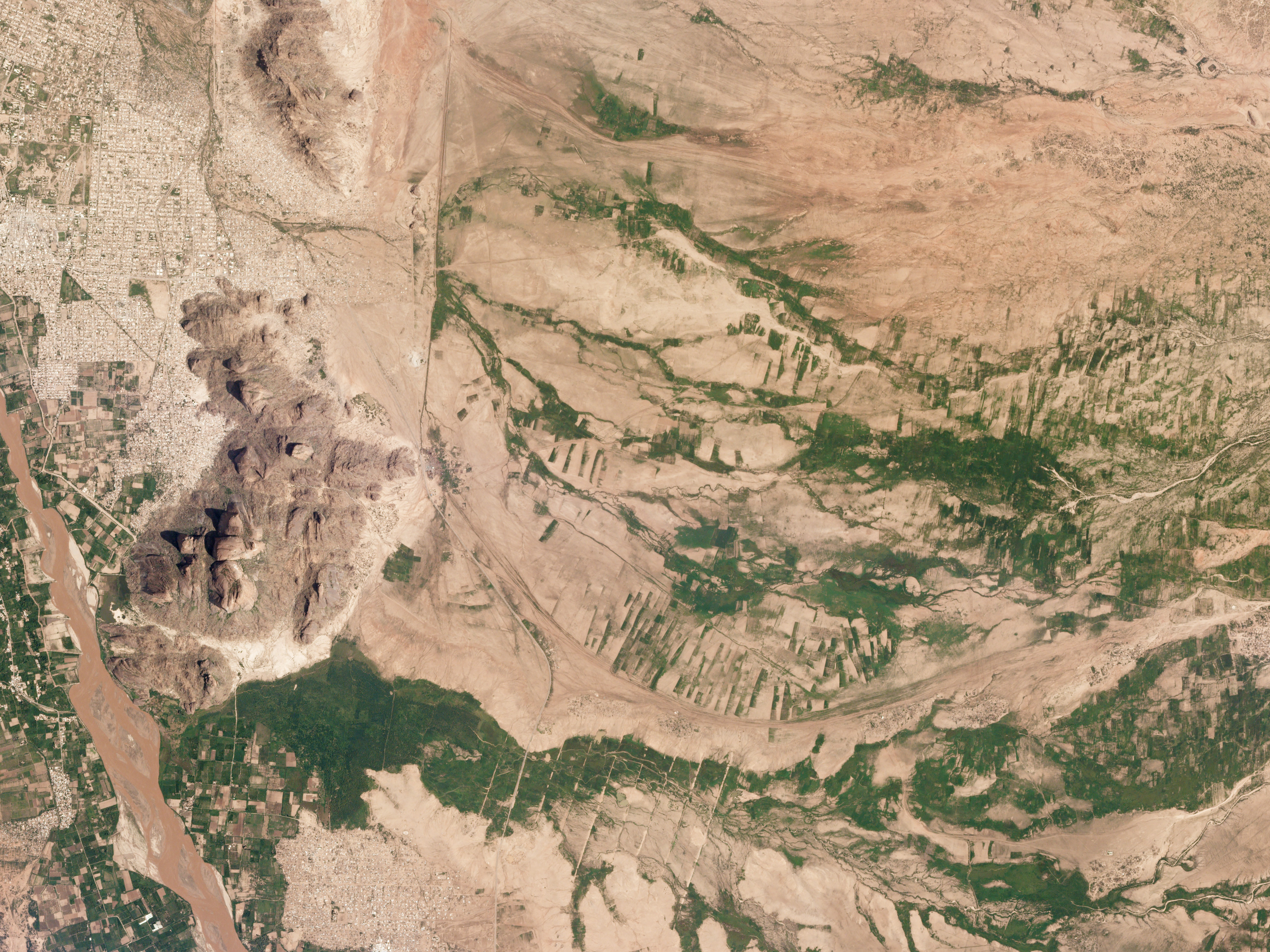
Aerial view

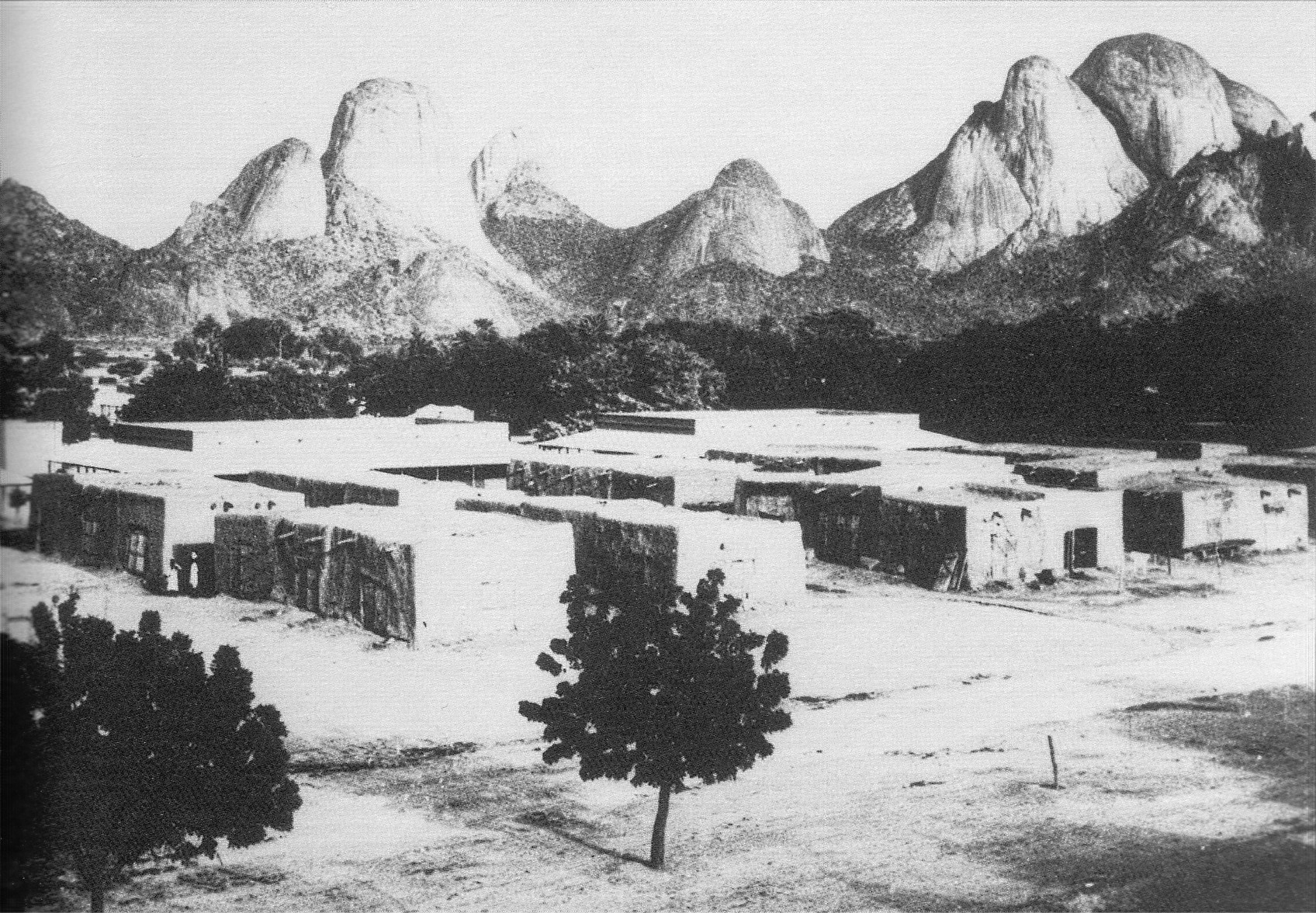
Photo from 1940 when the Italian Army was in the area

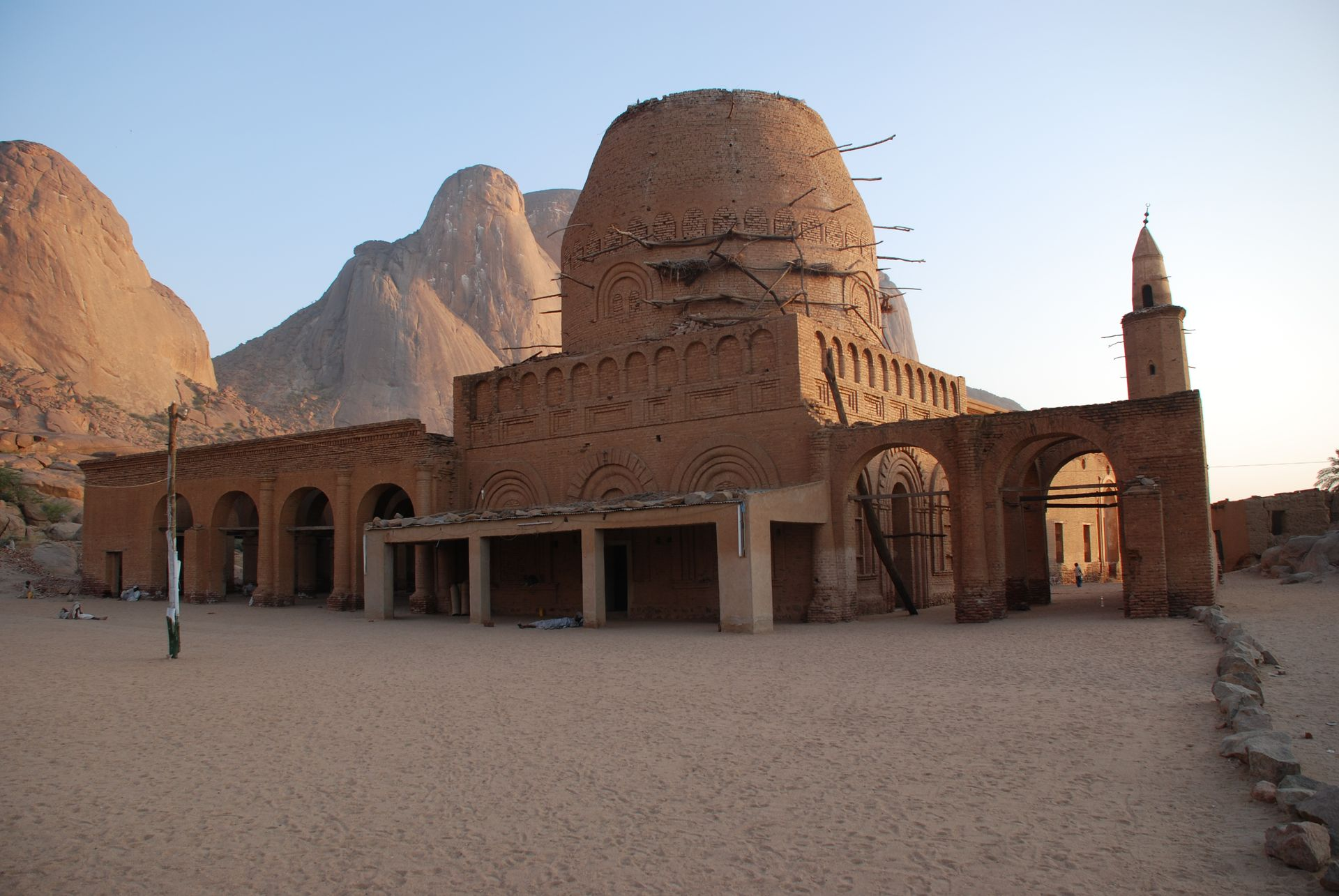
Tomb of Hassan

The Taka Mountains are granitic geologic features in eastern Sudan near Kassala. They are near Sudan's border with Eritrea. Cafes and vendors ply food and craft below them in Toteil.

Beja and Bani Amir live in the area. The Gash River passes through the area.
