= List of state soil science licensing boards =

This is a complete list of soil science licensing boards in the United States. State licensing in this context refers to any state regulatory program which limits the professional practice of soil science within state jurisdiction to individuals qualified by the state.

Registration and certification of professional soil scientists required by law is treated as licensure in the context of this list even when the term licensing is not utilized provided that the state uses that registration or certification to restrict professional practice of soil science.

== State Licensing Programs ==
- Alabama Board of Registration for Professional Soil Classifiers
- Arkansas Board of Registration for Professional Soil Classifiers
- Delaware
- Georgia Licensing Board for Professional Soil Scientists
- Indiana Indiana Registry of Soil Scientists
- Maine Board Of Certification For Geologists and Soil Scientists
- Minnesota Board of AELSLAGID
- Mississippi Bureau of Plant Industry Performs functions similar to a state licensing board.
- New Hampshire Board of Certification for Natural Scientists
- North Carolina Board for Licensing Soil Scientists
- North Dakota Board of Registration for Professional Soil Scientists
- South Carolina Soil Classifiers Advisory Council Performs functions similar to a state licensing board.
- Tennessee
- Texas Board of Professional Geoscientists
- Virginia Board for Professional Soil Scientists and Wetland Professionals
- Wisconsin Soil Science Section, Joint Board of Professional Geologists, Hydrologists and Soil Scientists

== See also ==
- Soil Science Society of America
