= Pedometric mapping =

Statistical method for studying soil

Pedometric mapping, or statistical soil mapping, is data-driven generation of soil property and class maps that is based on use of statistical methods. Its main objectives are to predict values of some soil variable at unobserved locations, and to access the uncertainty of that estimate using statistical inference i.e. statistically optimal approaches. From the application point of view, its main objective is to accurately predict response of a soil-plant ecosystem to various soil management strategies—that is, to generate maps of soil properties and soil classes that can be used for other environmental models and decision-making. It is largely based on applying geostatistics in soil science, and other statistical methods used in pedometrics.

Although pedometric mapping is mainly data-driven, it can also be largely based on expert knowledge—which, however, must be utilized within a pedometric computational framework to produce more accurate prediction models. For example, data assimilation techniques, such as the space-time Kalman filter, can be used to integrate pedogenetic knowledge and field observations.

In the information theory context, pedometric mapping is used to describe the spatial complexity of soils (information content of soil variables over a geographical area), and to represent this complexity using maps, summary measures, mathematical models and simulations. Simulations are a preferred way of visualizing soil patterns, as they represent their deterministic pattern (due to the landscape), geographic hot-spots, and short range variability (see image, below).

== Pedometrics ==
Pedometrics is the application of mathematical and statistical methods to the study of the distribution and genesis of soils.

The term is a portmanteau of the Greek roots pedos (soil) and metron (measurement). Measurement, in this case, is restricted to mathematical and statistical methods as it relates to pedology, the branch of soil science that studies soil in its natural setting.

Pedometrics addresses soil-related problems when there is uncertainty due to deterministic or stochastic variation, vagueness and lack of knowledge of soil properties and processes. It relies on mathematical, statistical and numerical methods, and includes numerical approaches to classification to deal with a supposed deterministic variation. Simulation models incorporate uncertainty by adopting chaos theory, statistical distribution, or fuzzy logic.

Pedometrics addresses pedology from the perspective of emerging scientific fields such as wavelets analysis, fuzzy set theory and data mining in soil data modelling applications. Its advance is also linked to improvements in remote and close-range sensing.

== Pedometric vs. traditional soil mapping ==
In traditional soil survey, spatial distribution of soil properties and soil bodies can be inferred from mental models, leading to manual delineations. Such methods can be considered subjective, and it is hence difficult or impossible to statistically assess the accuracy of such maps without additional field sampling. Traditional soil survey mapping also has limitations in a multithematic GIS, related to the fact that is often not consistently applied by different mappers, and is largely manual and difficult to automate. Most traditional soil maps are based on manual delineations of assumed soil bodies, to which soil attributes are then attached. With pedometric mapping, all outputs are based on rigorous statistical computing, and are hence reproducible.

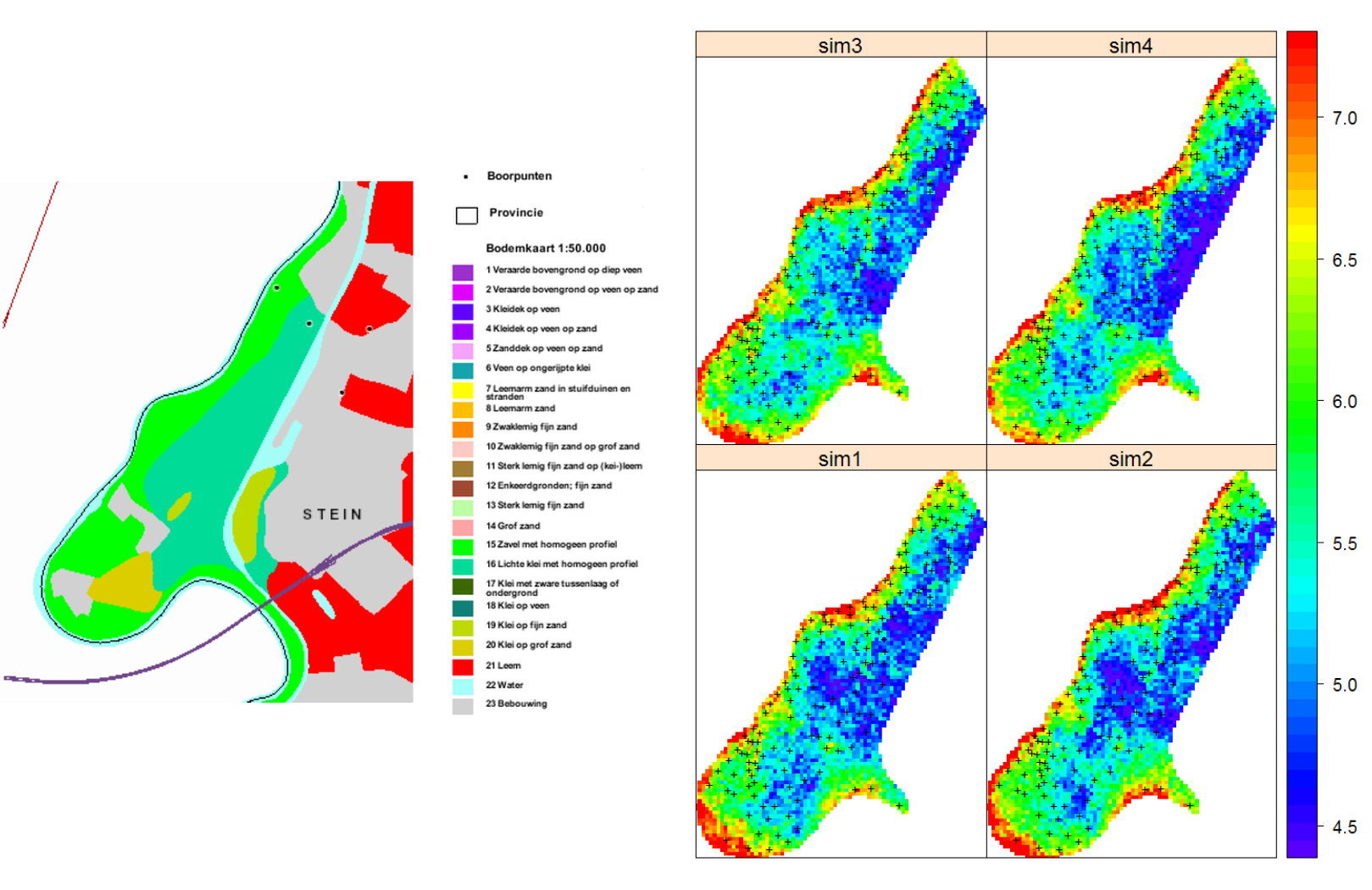
Traditional soil polygon map (left) vs pedometric map — four simulations of Zinc content in top-soil generated using geostatistical simulations as shown in this sp package gallery (right).

Pedometric mapping is based largely on extensive and detailed covariate layers, such as Digital Elevation Model (DEM) derivatives, remote sensing imagery, climatic, land cover and geological GIS layers and imagery. Its evolution can be closely connected with the emergence of new technologies and global, publicly available data sources such as the SRTM DEM, MODIS, ASTER and Landsat imagery, gamma radiometrics and LiDAR imagery, and new automated mapping methods.

Comparison between traditional and pedometric (data-driven) mapping techniques
| | Expert/knowledge-driven soil mapping | Data/technology-driven (pedometric) soil mapping |
| Target variables | Soil types (soil series) | Analytical soil properties |
| Spatial data model | Discrete (soil bodies) | Continuous/hybrid (quantities / probabilities) |
| Major inputs | Expert knowledge / soil profile description | Laboratory data / proximal soil sensing |
| Important covariates | Soil delineations (photo-interpretation) | Remote sensing images, DEM-derivatives |
| Spatial prediction model | Averaging per polygon | Automated (geo)statistics |
| Accuracy assessment | Validation of soil mapping units (kappa) | Cross-validation (RMSE) |
| Data representation | Polygon maps + attribute tables (2D) | Gridded maps (2D/3D) + prediction error map or simulations |
| Major technical aspect | Cartographic scale | Grid cell size |
| Soil sampling strategies | Free survey (surveyor selects sampling locations) | Statistical (design/model-based sampling designs) |

== Pedometric vs. digital soil mapping ==
Pedometric analyses rely strictly on geostatistics, whereas digital soil mapping uses more traditional soil-mapping concepts not strictly pedometric in nature. Also referred to as predictive soil mapping, digital soil mapping relies on computer-assisted inference of soil properties to produce digital maps of discrete soil types. Pedometric mapping does not produce maps delineating discrete soil types.

== Methods ==
Pedometric mapping methods differ based on the steps of soil survey data processing:

1. Sampling
2. Data screening
3. Preprocessing of soil covariates
4. Fitting of geostatistical model
5. Spatial prediction
6. Cross-validation / accuracy assessment
7. Visualization of outputs

One of the main theoretical bases for pedometric mapping is the universal model of soil variation:

$$Z(\mathbf{s}) = m(\mathbf{s}) + \varepsilon '(\mathbf{s}) + \varepsilon ''$$

...where $\textstyle{m(\mathbf{s})}$ is the deterministic part of soil variation, $\textstyle{\varepsilon '(\mathbf{s})}$ is the stochastic, spatially auto-correlated part of variation, and $\textstyle{\varepsilon ''}$ is the remaining residual variation (measurement errors, short-range variability etc.) that is also possibly dependent on $\textstyle{\mathbf{s}}$, but is not modeled. This model was first introduced by French mathematician Georges Matheron, and has proven the Best Unbiased Linear Predictor for spatial data. One way of using this model to produce predictions or simulations is by regression-kriging (also known as universal kriging). With soil data, the model's deterministic component is often based on the soil forming factors of climate, organism, relief, parent material (lithology), and time. This conceptual model, known as the CLORPT model, was introduced to soil-landscape modelling by Hans Jenny.

A special group of pedometric mapping techniques focuses on downscaling spatial information that can be area-based or continuous. Prediction of soil classes is also another subfield of pedometric mapping, where specific geostatistical methods are used to interpolate the factor-types of variables.

Pedometric mapping is also based largely on novel technologies for measuring soil properties, also referred to as digital soil mapping techniques. They include:

- Soil spectroscopy and proximal soil sensing (handheld or vehicle-driven devices)
- Remote sensing systems for soil mapping and monitoring (e.g. SMOS)
- LiDAR technology for digital elevation models
- Precision agriculture technologies
