= Georg Wiegner =

German chemist (1883–1936)

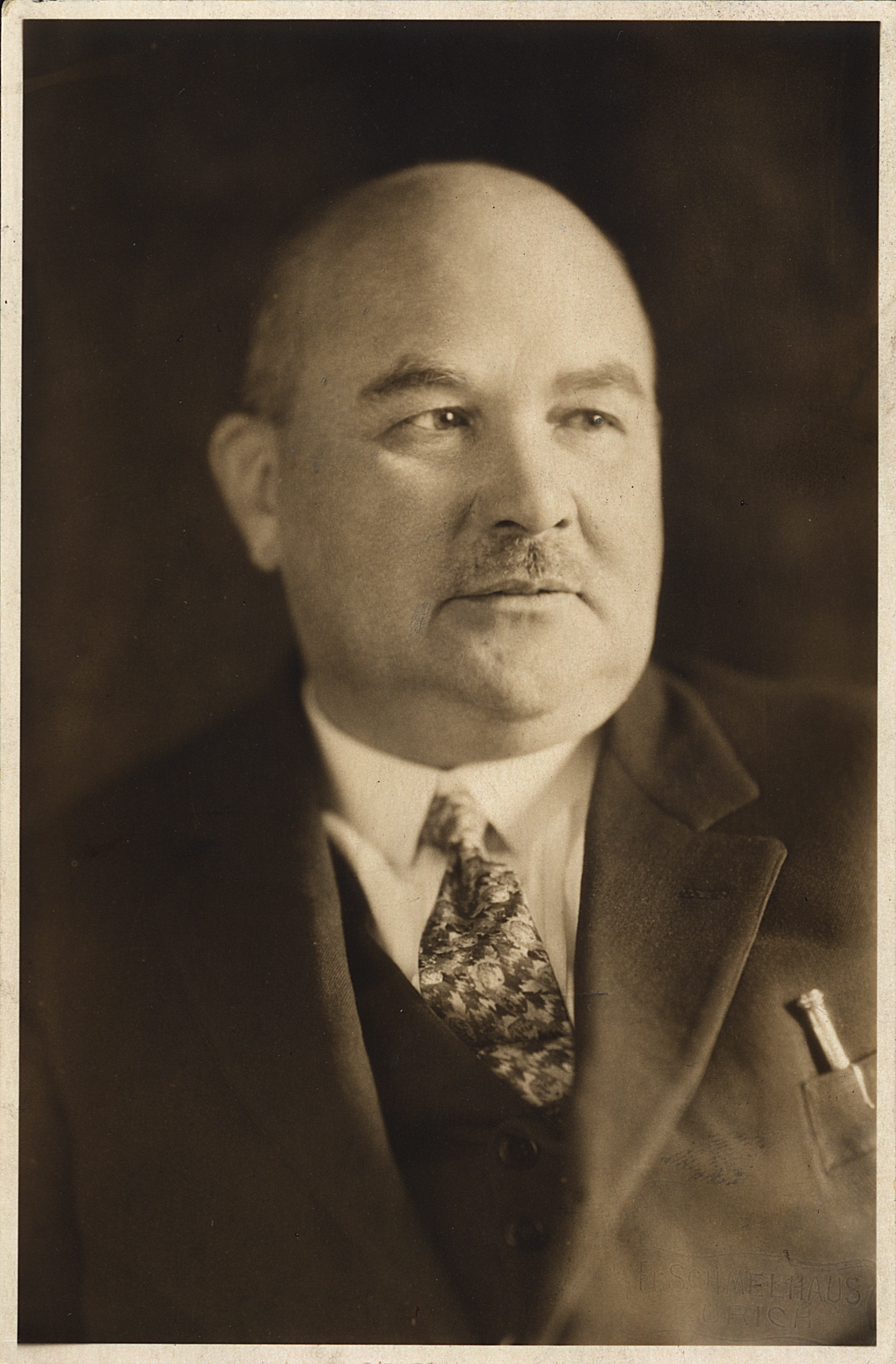
Georg Wiegner

Georg Wiegner (April 20, 1883 – April 14, 1936) was a colloid chemist. He was born in Leipzig and died in Zurich.

Georg Wiegner studied natural sciences at the University of Leipzig, and received a doctorate in 1906. He was an assistant to Wilhelm Fleischmann at the University of Göttingen from 1907. He was appointed professor of agricultural chemistry at the ETH Zurich in 1913, where he remained until the year of his death, in 1933. He was responsible for seminal discoveries in coagulation and ion exchange. His group at the ETH strongly influenced ecological pedology in Switzerland. The group who worked with him included Hermann Gessner (1897–1981), Hans Jenny (1899–1992) and Hans Pallmann (1903–1965). His group also influenced the work of Max Düggeli, who had a major influence on soil biology in Switzerland.

== Works ==
- Boden und Bodenbildung Kolloidchemischer Betrachtung, 1918
- Anleitung zum quantitativischen agrikulturchemischen Praktikum, 1919
