= Soil map =

Map showing properties of soil

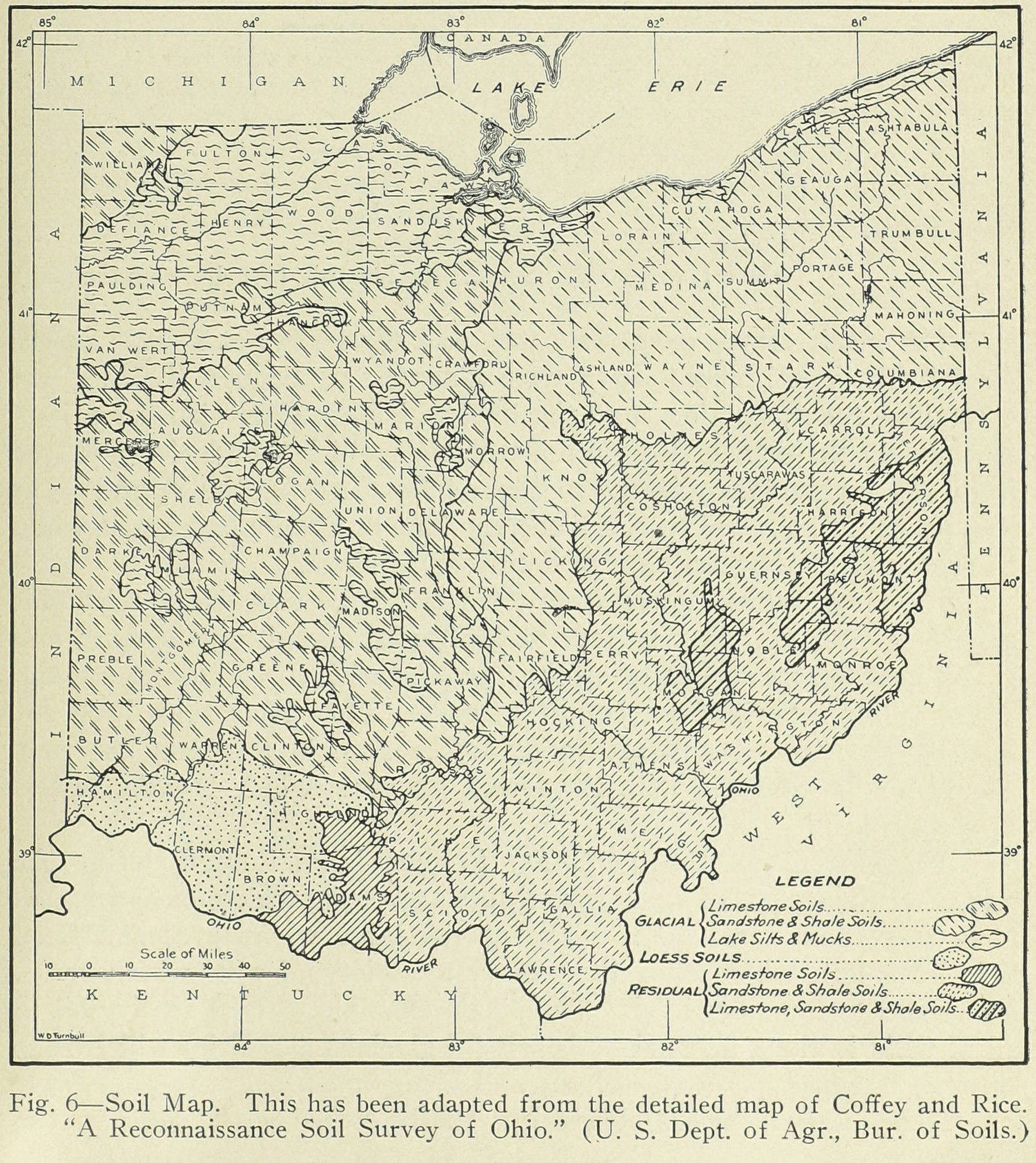
Soil map from "Geography of Ohio," 1923

A soil map is a geographical representation showing diversity of soil types or soil properties (soil pH, textures, organic matter, depths of horizons etc.) in the area of interest. It is typically the result of a soil survey inventory, i.e. soil survey. Soil maps are most commonly used for land evaluation, spatial planning, agricultural extension, environmental protection and similar projects. Traditional soil maps typically show only general distribution of soils, accompanied by the soil survey report. Many new soil maps are derived using digital soil mapping techniques. Such maps are typically richer in context and show higher spatial detail, yet are not necessarily more accurate than traditional soil maps. Soil maps produced using (geo)statistical technique can also include an estimate of the model uncertainty.

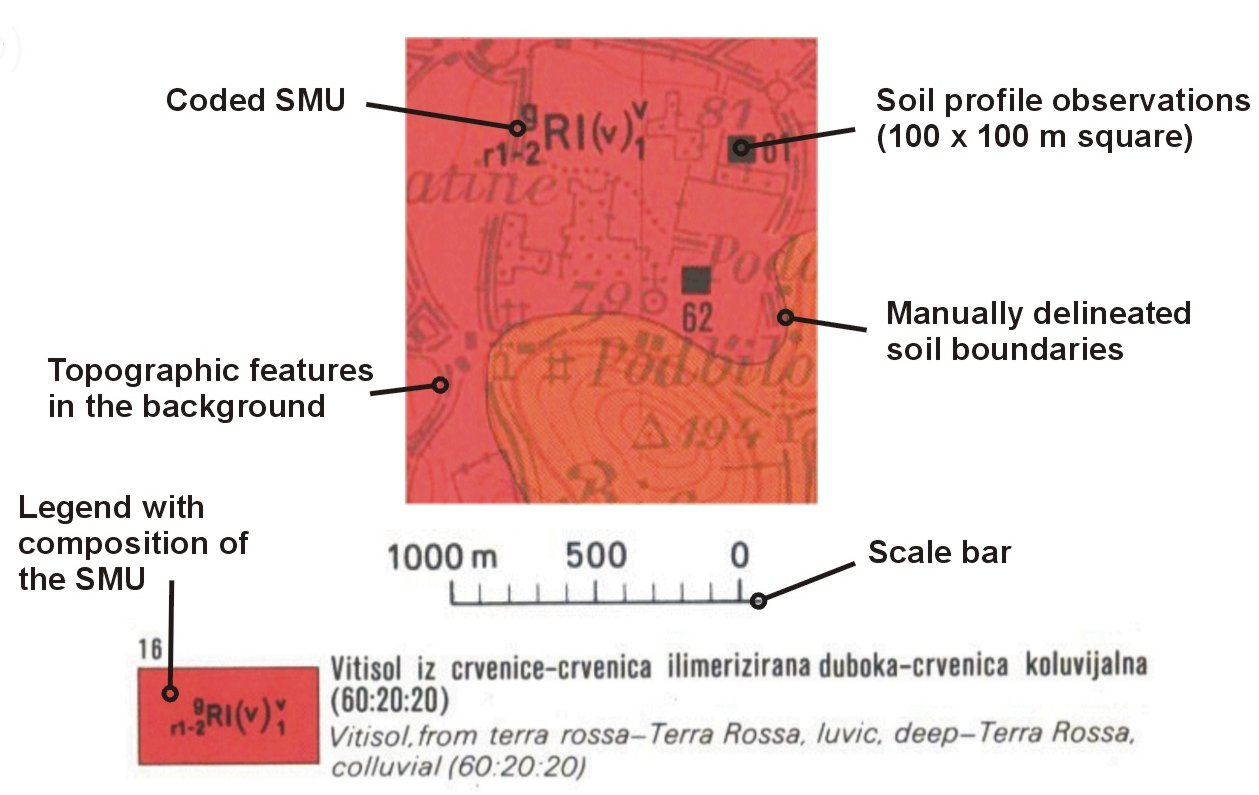
An example of a traditional soil map showing soil mapping units, described soil profiles and legend.

In the digital era, soil maps come in various digital vector and raster formats and are used for various applications in geosciences and environmental sciences. In this context, soil maps are only visualizations of the soil resource inventories commonly stored in a Soil Information System (SIS), of which the major part is a Soil Geographical Database. A Soil Information System is basically a systematic collection of complete (values of the target soil variables available for the whole area of interest) and consistent gridded or vector soil property and/or class maps with an attached report, user manual and/or metadata. A SIS is in the most cases, a combination of polygon and point maps linked with attribute tables for profile observations, soil mapping units and soil classes. Different elements of an SIS can be manipulated and then visualized against the spatial reference (grids or polygons). For example, soil profiles can be used to make spatial prediction of different chemical and physical soil properties. In the case of pedometric mapping, both predictions and simulations (2D or 3D – geographic location plus soil depth) of values are visualized and used for GIS modeling.

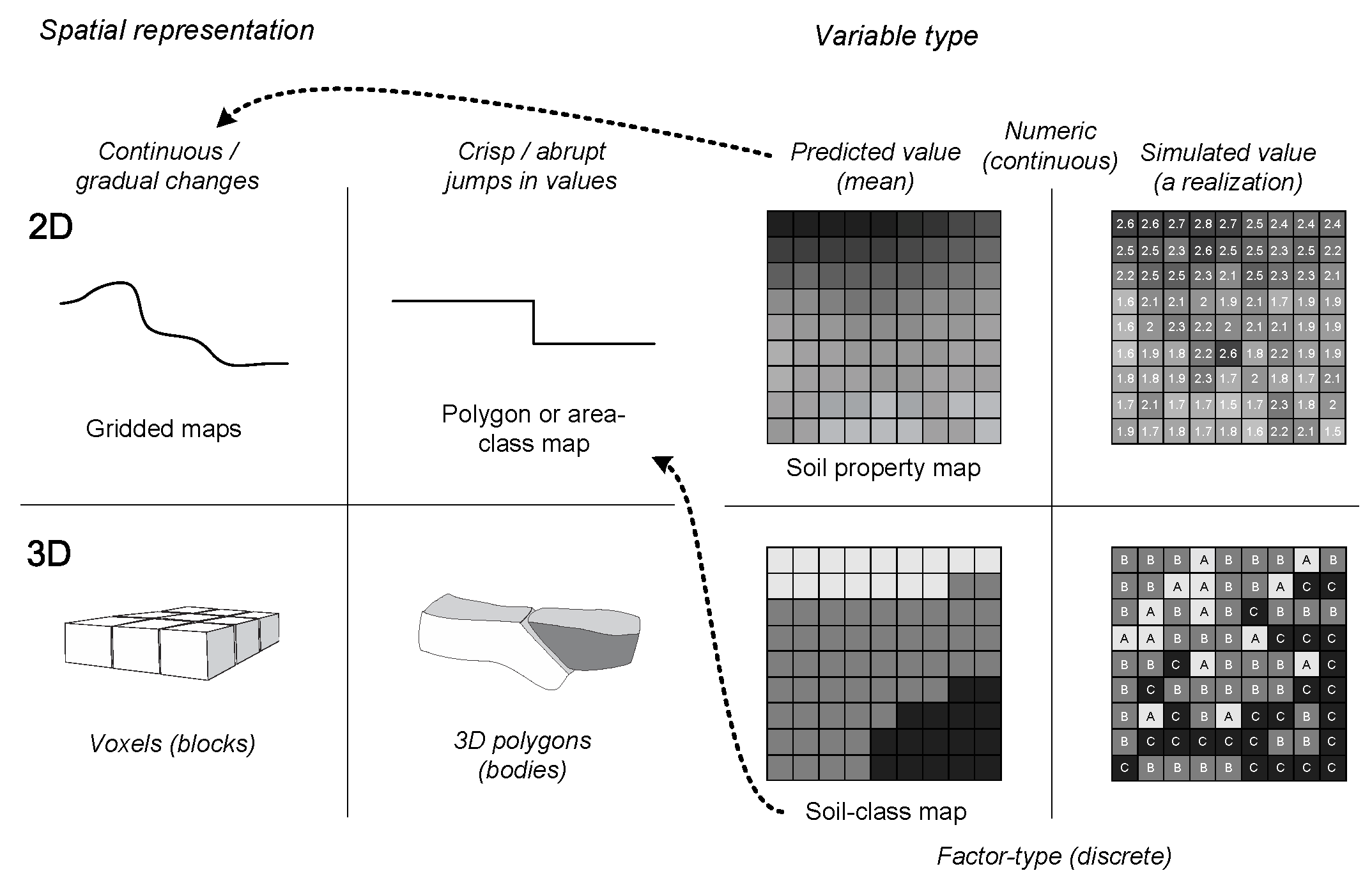
Classification of types of soil maps based on spatial representation and variable type.

It is important to distinguish between the following types of soil maps:

- hand-drawn soil polygon maps representing distribution of soil types;
- simulated or predicted 2D/3D soil property maps (primary or secondary soil properties);
- simulated or predicted (2D) soil-class maps;

One should also distinguish soil maps that display primary soil attributes, i.e. the soil attributes originally described or measured in the field, and the soil inferred attributes also called secondary soil information, i.e. the properties of the soils in the context of the soil use: soil production capacity, soil reaction to certain use, soil functions, soil degradation measures, etc.

== See also ==
- Map
- Soil science
- Soil survey
- Pedometric mapping
- Digital soil mapping
- Geographic information system (GIS)
- Pedometrics
