= Soil color =

Morphological property of soil

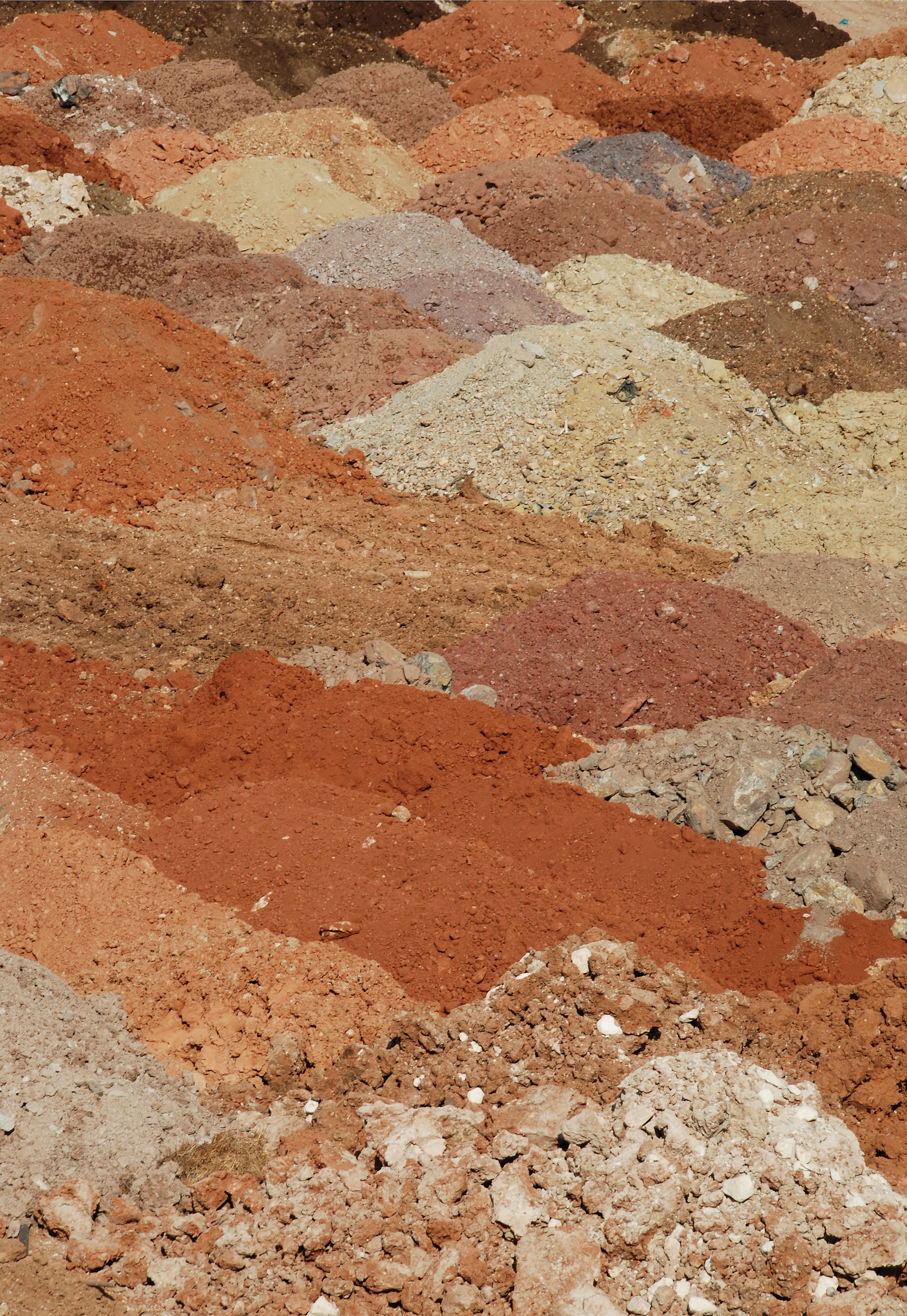
Soil colors influenced by mineralogy

Soil color is often the most visually apparent property of soil. While color itself does not influence the behavior or practical use of soils, it does indicate important information about soil organic matter content, mineralogy, moisture, and leaching.

Soil can display a wide range of colors including brown, red, yellow, black, gray, white, and even blue or green, and vary dramatically across landscapes, between the various horizons of a soil profile, and even within a single clod of soil.

The development and distribution of color in soil results from chemical and biological weathering, especially redox reactions. As the primary minerals in soil parent material weather, the elements combine into new and colorful compounds. Soil conditions produce uniform or gradual color changes, while reducing environments result in disrupted color flow with complex, mottled patterns and points of color concentration. Sometimes, a distinct change in color within a soil profile indicates a change in the soil parent material or mineral origin.

== Causes ==
=== Dark brown or black ===
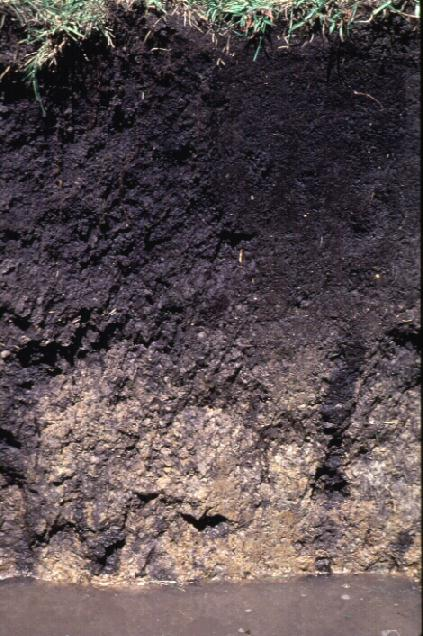
Dark soil color imparted by organic matter in Illinois, US

Dark brown or black colors typically indicate that the soil has a high organic matter content. Organic matter coats mineral soil particles, which masks or darkens the natural mineral colors.

Sodium content also influences the depth of organic matter and therefore the soil color. Sodium causes organic matter particles such as humus to disperse more readily and reach more minerals. Additionally, soils which accumulate charcoal exhibit a black color.

=== Red ===
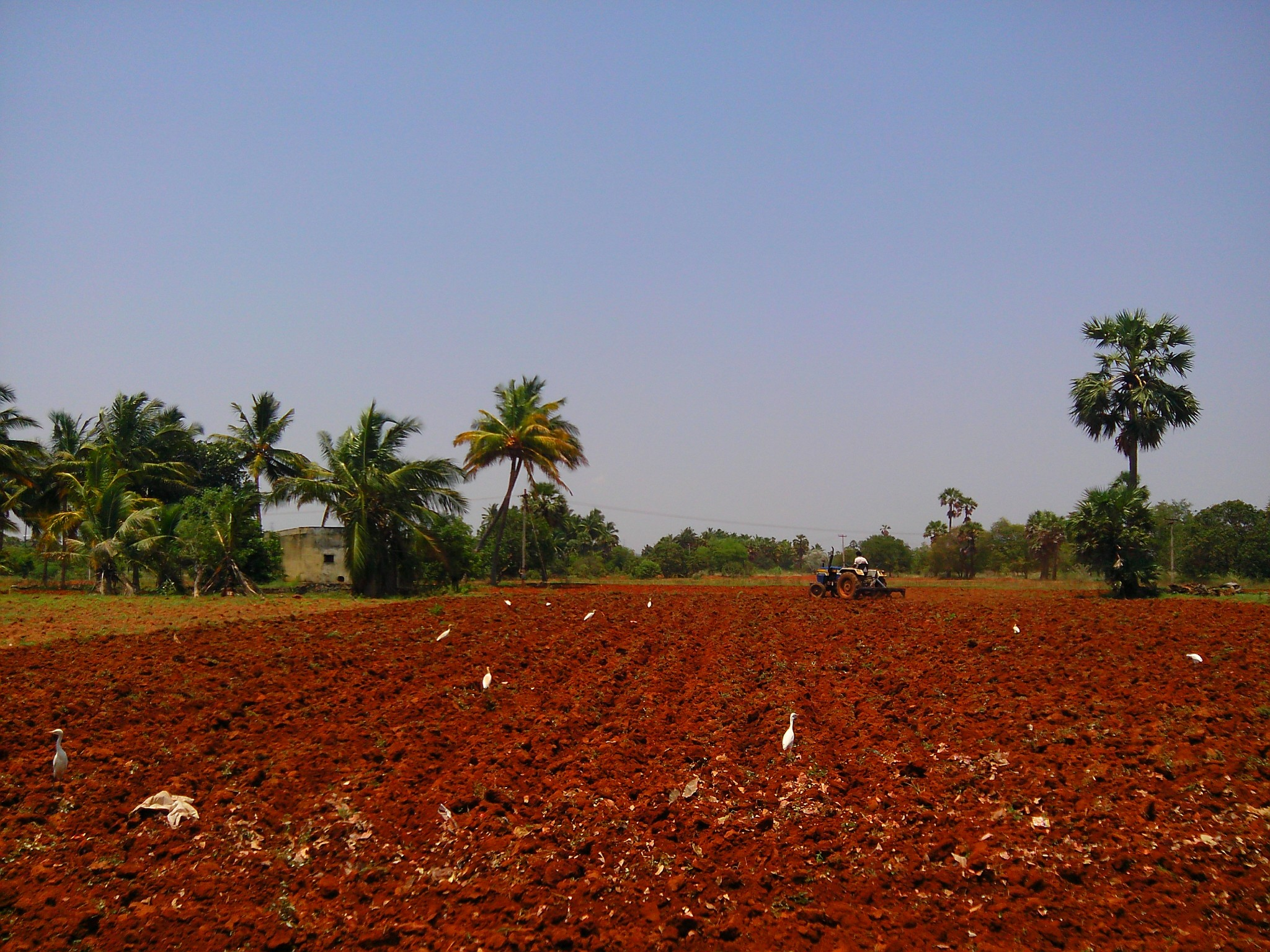
Highly oxidized red soil in Tirunelveli District, India

Red colors often indicate iron accumulation or oxidation in oxygen-rich, well-aerated soils. Iron concentrations caused by redox reactions because of diffusion of iron in crystalline and metamorphic rock, in periodically saturated soils, may also present red colors, particularly along root channels or pores.

=== Gray or blue ===
Soil in anaerobic, saturated environments may appear gray or blue in color due to redox reduction and/or depletion of iron. In anaerobic soils, microbes reduce iron from the ferric (Fe^{3+}) to the ferrous (Fe^{2+}) form. Manganese may also be reduced from the manganic (Mn^{4+}) to the manganous (Mn^{2+}) form, though iron reduction is more common in soil. The reduced iron compounds cause poorly drained soil to appear gray or blue, and because reduced iron is soluble in water, it may be removed from the soil during prolonged saturation. This often exposes the light gray colors of bare silicate minerals, and soils with a low chroma from iron reduction or depletion are said to be gleyed.

=== Green ===
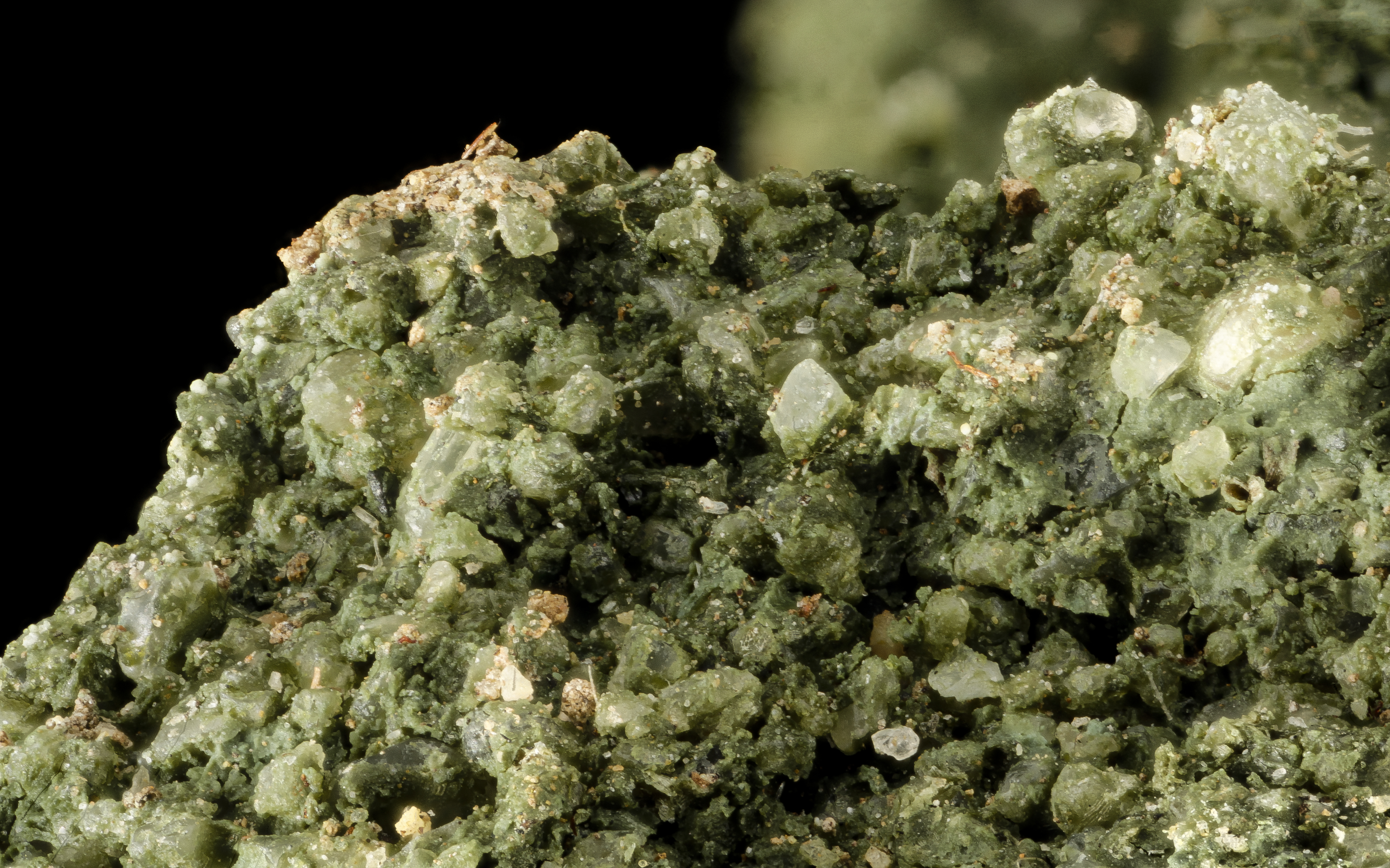
Glauconitic, green soil from Maryland, US

Iron reduction may impart greenish gray colors, though certain minerals including glauconite, melanterite, and celadonite can also give soil a green color. Glauconite soils form from select marine sedimentary rocks, while melanterite soils are produced in acidic, pyrite-rich soils. Celadonite in hydrothermally-altered basalt within the Mojave Desert has been observed to weather into a green colored smectite-rich clay soil.

=== Yellow ===
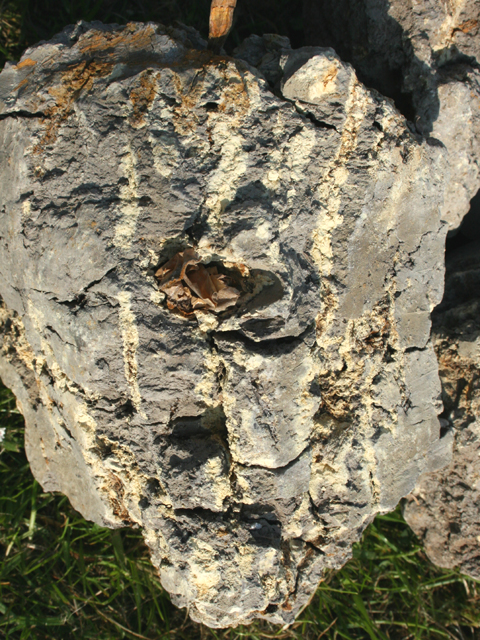
Jarosite accumulation in acidic soil in Cambridgeshire, UK

Yellow soils may indicate iron accumulation as well, though in less oxygen-rich environments than red soils. Jarosite accumulation can also create yellow soil color and may be found in salt marshes, sulfide ore deposits, acid mine tailings, and other acidic soils.

=== White ===
White colors are common in soils with salt, carbonate, or calcite accumulations, which often occur in arid environments.

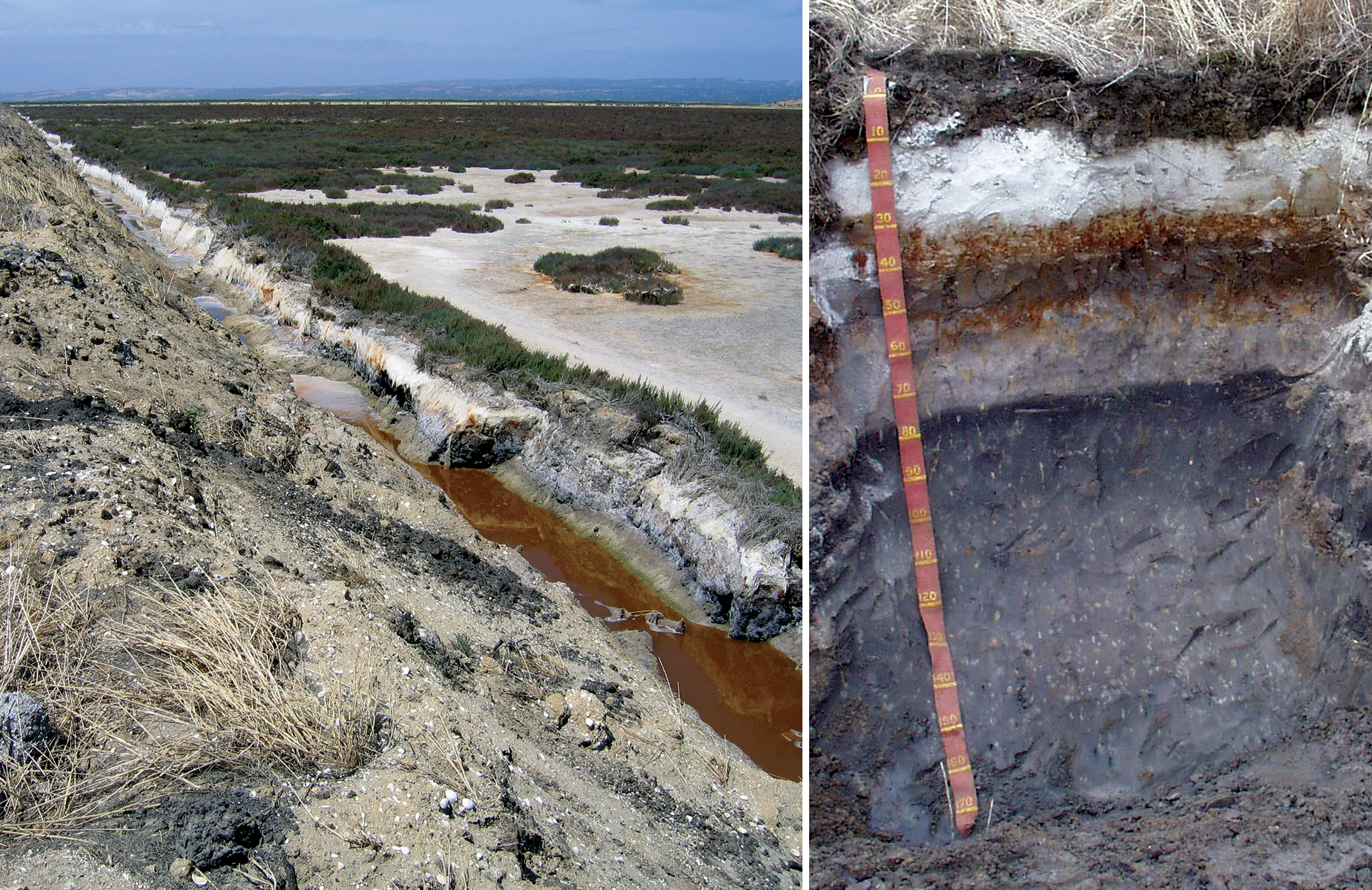
Multiple soil colors in a marsh soil in South Australia

== Description ==
Most soil survey organizations utilize the Munsell color system to decrease the subjectivity in evaluating color. This system was developed by Albert Munsell, a painter in the early 20th century, to describe the full-color spectrum, though the specially adapted Munsell soil color charts commonly used by soil scientists only include the most relevant colors for soil.

The Munsell color system includes the following three components:

- Hue: indicates the dominant spectral (i.e., rainbow) color, which in the soil is generally yellow or red. Each page of the Munsell soil color book displays a different hue. Examples include 10YR, 5YR, and 2.5Y.
- Value: indicates lightness or darkness. The value increases from the bottom of each page to the top, with lower numbers representing darker colors. Color with a value of 0 would be black.
- Chroma: indicates intensity or brightness. Chroma increases from left to right on each page, with higher numbers representing more vivid or saturated colors. Color with a chroma of 0 would be neutral gray.

A general color name, such as yellowish brown or light gray, often accompanies the Munsell notation for soil samples. These qualitative descriptors correspond to one or more color chips in the Munsell soil color books; however, they are not formally part of the broader Munsell color system.

Because soil color (specifically the value) varies with moisture, it may be described at both its moist and dry state. Soil is considered moist when adding water no longer changes the soil color or as "dry" when the soil is air dried.

== See also ==
- Calciorthid
