= Hans Jenny (pedologist) =

Swiss geographer and pedologist (1899–1992)

- Born: 7 February 1899; Basel, Switzerland
- Died: 9 January 1992 (aged 92); Berkeley, California, U.S.
- Education: ETH Zurich
- Known for: Factors of soil formation
- Scientific career
- Fields: Pedology (soil study)
- Workplaces: University of Missouri, University of California, Berkeley
- Doctoral advisor: Georg Wiegner

Hans Jenny (7 February 1899 – 9 January 1992) was a Swiss-born soil scientist and expert on pedology (the study of soil in its natural environment), particularly the processes of soil formation. He served as 1949 President of the Soil Science Society of America.

== Overview ==
Hans Jenny was born in Basel, Switzerland. He earned a diploma in agriculture from the Swiss Federal Institute of Technology (ETH Zurich) in 1922, and a D. Sc. degree in 1927 for a thesis on ion exchange reactions.

Following an appointment at the University of Missouri, he joined the faculty of the University of California at Berkeley in 1936. International recognition came to Jenny after the 1941 publication of Factors of Soil Formation: A System of Quantitative Pedology. His synthesis of field studies with the abstract formalism of physical chemistry set down the generic mathematical relationship that connects the observed properties of soil with the independent factors that determine the process of soil formation:

s = f(cl, o, r, p, t, ...)

where s - soil properties; cl - regional climate; o - potential biota, r - relief; p - parent material; t - time.

Jenny left the ellipsis open to indicate that there might be other variables in the function.

In The Soil Resource, Origin and Behaviour (1980), Jenny redefined the soil forming factors as state variables and extended the effects to ecosystem properties. Parent material and relief define the initial state for soil development, regional climate, and potential biota, determine the rate at which chemical and biological transformations proceed, and time determines the reach of these processes and their expression in ecosystem, soil, vegetation, and animal component properties.

One notable project was his study of the Mendocino pygmy forest, a remarkable community of ericaceous and coniferous plant species whose stunted growth and grotesquely twisted morphology reveal a long and tortured struggle for survival on a 500,000-year-old marine terrace. The University of California's Jenny Pygmy Forest Reserve is named in his honor and is found adjacent to Van Damme State Park. Jenny did much of his pygmy forest research within the boundaries of Jug Handle State Natural Reserve, which, due to Hans and his wife Jean's lobbying, was designated the Pygmy Forest National Natural Landmark by the National Park Service in 1974.

Jenny applied fundamental soil science to the problems of the day when he wrote in 1980 in his article "Alcohol or Humus" about "the rosy outlook that is sweeping the nation about converting biomass to alcohol and gasohol...We are promised construction of ingenious machines that will pick up all crop residues in the fields and leaf litter and humus in the forests. The carbon and nitrogen cycles of ecosystems will be curtailed and soil stability endangered. Because of a possible climatic warm-up, we do not wish to accelerate humus oxidation and the concomitant flux of carbon dioxide from soil into the atmosphere. I am arguing against indiscriminate conversion of biomass and organic wastes to fuels. The humus capital, which is substantial, deserves being maintained because good soils are a national asset."

== Bibliography ==
- Jenny, Hans (1929) Relation of temperature to the amount of nitrogen in soils. Soil Science 27: 169–188.
- Jenny, Hans (1936) Simple kinetic theory of ionic exchange. I. Ions of equal valency. Journal of Physical Chemistry 40: 501–507.
- Jenny, Hans (1941). Factors of soil formation—a system of quantitative pedology. McGraw-Hill.
- Jenny, Hans (1961) E.W. Hilgard and the Birth of Modern Soil Science. Pisa, Italy: Collana della Rivista Agrochimia.
- Jenny, Hans (1968) The image of soil in landscape art, old and new. Pontifical Academy of Sciences Scripta Varia 32: 947–979.
- Jenny, Hans (1980) The Soil Resource, Origin and Behaviour, Springer-Verlag, New York.
- Jenny, Hans (1989) Hans Jenny. Soil Scientist, Teacher, and Scholar. Regional Oral History Office, The Bancroft Library, University of California–Berkeley, CA.
- Jenny, Hans (1994) Factors of Soil Formation. A System of Quantitative Pedology. New York: Dover Press. (Reprint, with foreword by R. Amundson, of the 1941 McGraw-Hill publication). pdf file format.
- Jenny, Hans and K. Stuart (1984) My friend, the soil. Journal of Soil and Water Conservation 39: 158–161.
- Jenny, Hans, R. Overstreet, and A.D. Ayers (1939) Contact depletion of bare roots as revealed by radioactive indicators. Soil Science 48: 9–24.
- Jenny, Hans, T.R. Nielsen, N.T. Colemna, and D.E. Williams (1950) Concerning the measurement of pH, ion activities, and membrane potentials in colloidal systems. Science 112: 164–167.

== See also ==
- Clorpt
- History of Soil Science
- Pedogenesis
- SCORPAN
