= Toteil =

Village in Sudan

Coordinates: 15°25′42″N 36°25′23.0″E

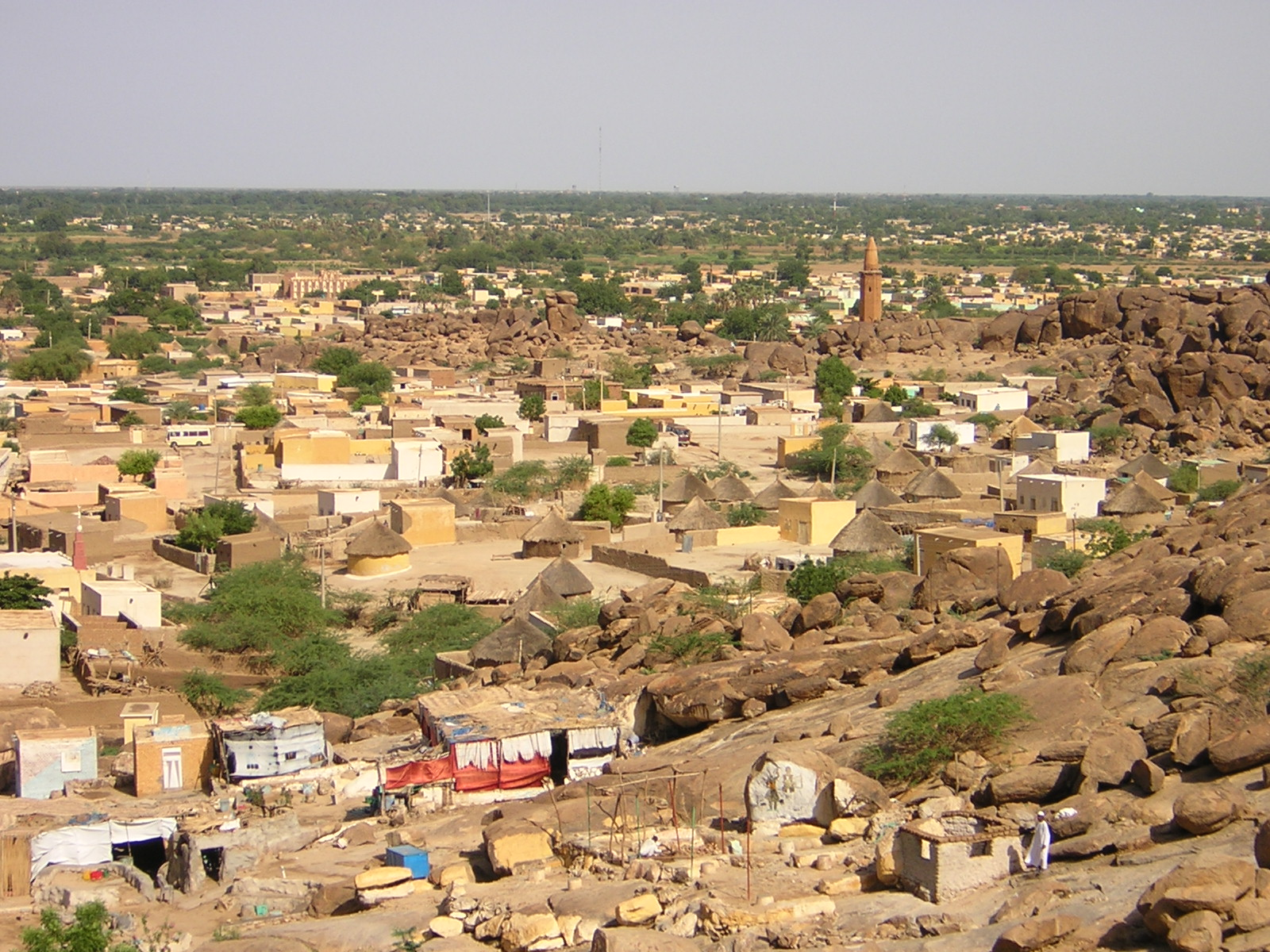
View of Toteil from the Taka Mountains

Toteil is a small village located at the southern edge of the Taka Mountains in Kassala State around 4.16 km from Kassala in Sudan. According to Lonely Planet Toteil is "noted for atmospheric cafes serving delicious coffee and popcorns in lovely surrounds". The historic Khatmiyah Mosque is 15–20-minute walk away.
