= Land Suitability classification =

The Land Suitability Classification is a soil evaluation method, developed by FAO. FAO stated that Land suitability is the fitness of a given type of land for a defined use. The land may be considered in its present condition or after improvements. The process of land suitability classification is the appraisal and grouping of specific areas of land in terms of their suitability for defined uses.

== Structure ==
Each category retains its basic meaning within the context of the different classifications and as applied to different kinds of land use. Four categories of decreasing generalization are recognized:

- I. Land Suitability Orders: reflecting kinds of suitability.
- II. Land Suitability Classes: reflecting degrees of suitability within Orders.
- III. Land Suitability Subclasses: reflecting kinds of limitation, or main kinds of improvement measures required, within Classes.
- IV. Land Suitability Units: reflecting minor differences in required management within Subclasses

=== Land Suitability Orders ===
Land suitability Orders indicate whether land is assessed as suitable or not suitable for the use under consideration. There are two orders represented in maps, tables, etc. by the symbols S and N respectively.

- Order S: Suitable. Land on which sustained use of the kind under consideration is expected to yield benefits which justify the inputs, without unacceptable risk of damage to land resources.
- Order N: Not Suitable. Land which has qualities that appear to preclude sustained use of the kind under consideration.

Land may be classed as Not Suitable for a given use for a number of reasons. It may be that the proposed use is technically impracticable, such as the irrigation of rocky steep land, or that it would cause severe environmental degradation, such as the cultivation of steep slopes. Frequently, however, the reason is economic: that the value of the expected benefits does not justify the expected costs of the inputs that would be required.

=== Land Suitability Classes ===
Land suitability Classes reflect degrees of suitability. The classes are numbered consecutively, by Arabic numbers, in sequence of decreasing degrees of suitability within the Order. Within the Order Suitable the number of classes is not specified. There might, for example, be only two, S1 and S2. The number of classes recognized should be kept to the minimum necessary to meet interpretative aims; five should probably be the most ever used.

If three Classes are recognized within the Order Suitable, as can often be recommended, the following names and definitions may be appropriate in a qualitative classification:

- Class S1 Highly Suitable: Land having no significant limitations to sustained application of a given use, or only minor limitations that will not significantly reduce productivity or benefits and will not raise inputs above an acceptable level.
- Class S2 Moderately Suitable: Land having limitations which in aggregate are moderately severe for sustained application of a given use; the limitations will reduce productivity or benefits and increase required inputs to the extent that the overall advantage to be gained from the use, although still attractive, will be appreciably inferior to that expected on Class S1 land.
- Class S3 Marginally Suitable: Land having limitations which in aggregate are severe for sustained application of a given use and will so reduce productivity or benefits, or increase required inputs, that this expenditure will be only marginally justified.

Within the Order Not Suitable, there are normally two Classes:

- Class N1 Currently Not Suitable: Land having limitations which may be surmountable in time but which cannot be corrected with existing knowledge at currently acceptable cost; the limitations are so severe as to preclude successful sustained use of the land in the given manner.
- Class N2 Permanently Not Suitable: Land having limitations which appear so severe as to preclude any possibilities Of successful sustained use of the land in the given manner.
