= Kassala =

Town in Kassala State, Sudan

Kassala كسلا (Arabic) ከሰላ (Tigrinya)
- City
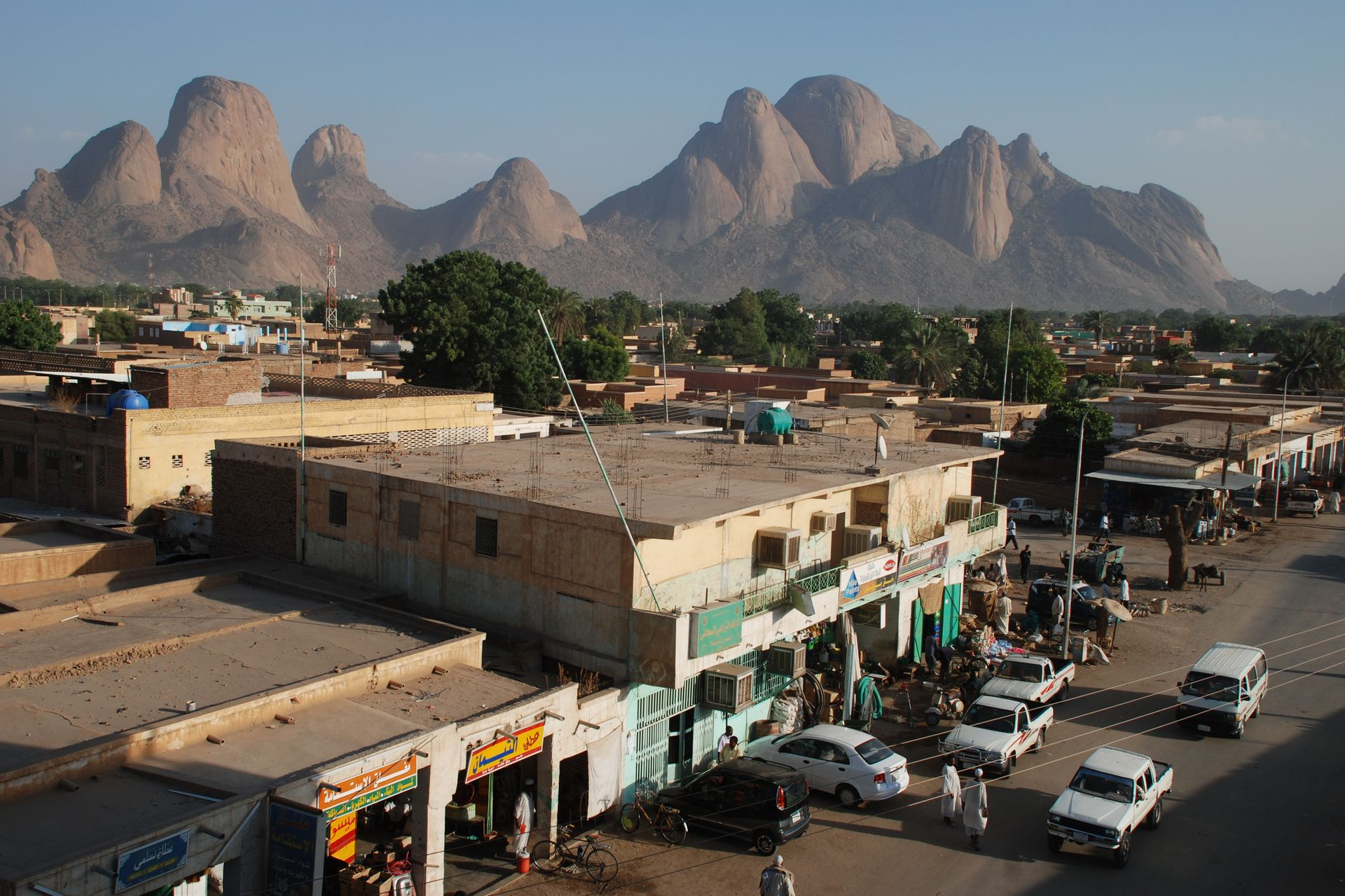
- Overlooking Kassala the Taka Mountains are seen in the background

- Location in Sudan
- Coordinates: 15°27′24″N 36°24′15″E
- Country: Sudan
- State: Kassala State
- Elevation: 1,665 ft (507 m)

Population (2025)
  - Total: 411,574
- Time zone: UTC+02:00 (CAT)

Kassala (Arabic: كسلا, Tigrinya: ከሰላ) is the capital of the state of Kassala in eastern Sudan. In 2003 its population was recorded to be 530,950. Built on the banks of the Gash River, it is a market city and is famous for its fruit gardens. Many of its inhabitants are from the Hadendawa sub-tribe of the Beja ethnic group.

The city was formerly a railroad hub, however, as of 2006 there was no operational railway station in Kassala and much of the track leading to and from the city has been salvaged or fallen into disrepair. Kassala's location along the main Khartoum-Port Sudan highway makes it an important trade center.

== History ==
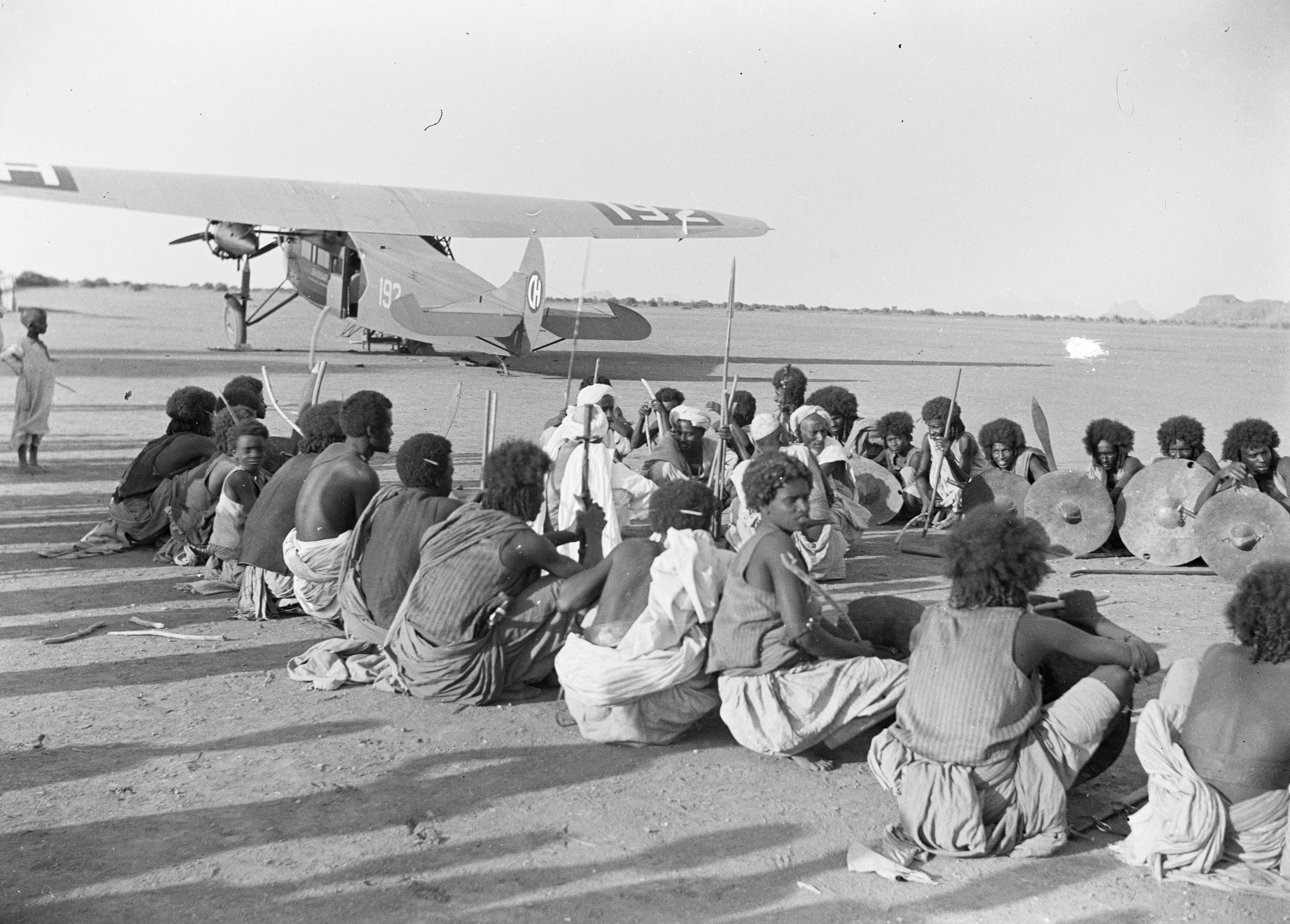
Kassala locals photographed during Walter Mittelholzer's visit in February 1934. His Swissair Fokker F.VIIb-3 m (CH-192) is in the background.

In 1834, the Egyptian Army established Kassala as a garrison town following its conquest of Sudan in 1821. When the Mahdist state was established, the Egyptian garrison in Kassala found itself besieged by Mahdist forces. Under the terms of the 1884 Hewett Treaty, Abyssinian forces led by Ras Alula attempted to rescue the Egyptians. Although Ras Alula successfully defeated the Mahdists at the Battle of Kufit, he was unable to breach Kassala’s defenses and liberate the Egyptians. In 1886, after prolonged resistance, the Egyptian garrison finally surrendered to the Mahdists under Osman Digna.

On July 17, 1894, Italy annexed Kassala to Italian Eritrea. The Italians fortified the town and brought stability to the region by successfully defeating the Mahdists at the Battle of Kassala. However, Italy's defeat at the Battle of Adwa in 1896 forced the Italians to evacuate the town after failing to hold it until the arrival of advancing Anglo-Egyptian forces, who re-occupied Kassala and incorporated it into Anglo-Egyptian Sudan.

In the early 1900s, a railway was constructed, first linking Kassala to the Red Sea port of Port Sudan—built in 1906 to replace Suakin—and later, in 1929, extending to Sennar on the southern frontiers of the Gezira Cotton Scheme. When the Anglo-Egyptian forces re-established control over Sudan, Kassala developed into a thriving trade center serving the Ethiopian hinterlands. Horticulture was introduced in the fertile lands near the Gash and Barka rivers, and the British later introduced cotton cultivation. The Kassala Cotton Company, a subsidiary of the Sudan Plantations Syndicate, played a role in these developments.

In July 1940, during the East African Campaign, Italian forces advancing from Italian East Africa forced the local British garrison to withdraw from Kassala. The Italians then occupied the city with brigade-sized units: on July 4, 1940 the Italians started their offensive with 2,500 men (and one brigade of cavalry) supported by 24 tanks, while to defend Kassala for Britain there were 1,300 colonial soldiers with their British officers who -after some initial heavy fighting- were easily defeated. In mid-January 1941, the Italians withdrew from the city and a British garrison returned.

In 2003, Kassala's population was estimated at 530,950 inhabitants. The town is ethnically diverse, comprising groups such as the Beja, Beni-Amer, Amarar, Bishari, Rashaida, and Halanga, as well as significant immigrant communities from northern and western Sudan, including the Fula and Nuba peoples. The Ethiopian-Eritrean War (1998–2000) displaced an estimated 110,000 Eritreans refugees to the Kassala area, particularly from the border towns of Barentu and Teseney, which were overrun by the Ethiopian Army.

In 2025, during the Sudanese civil war (2023-present), Kassala had been involved in conflict for the first time since the war began in 2023. The RSF attacked Kassala with drones on 3 May 2025, targeting the fuel storage area at the Kassala Airport. This attack marked the second furthest drone attack by the RSF from controlled areas by the RSF. RSF later attacked Port Sudan.

== Climate ==
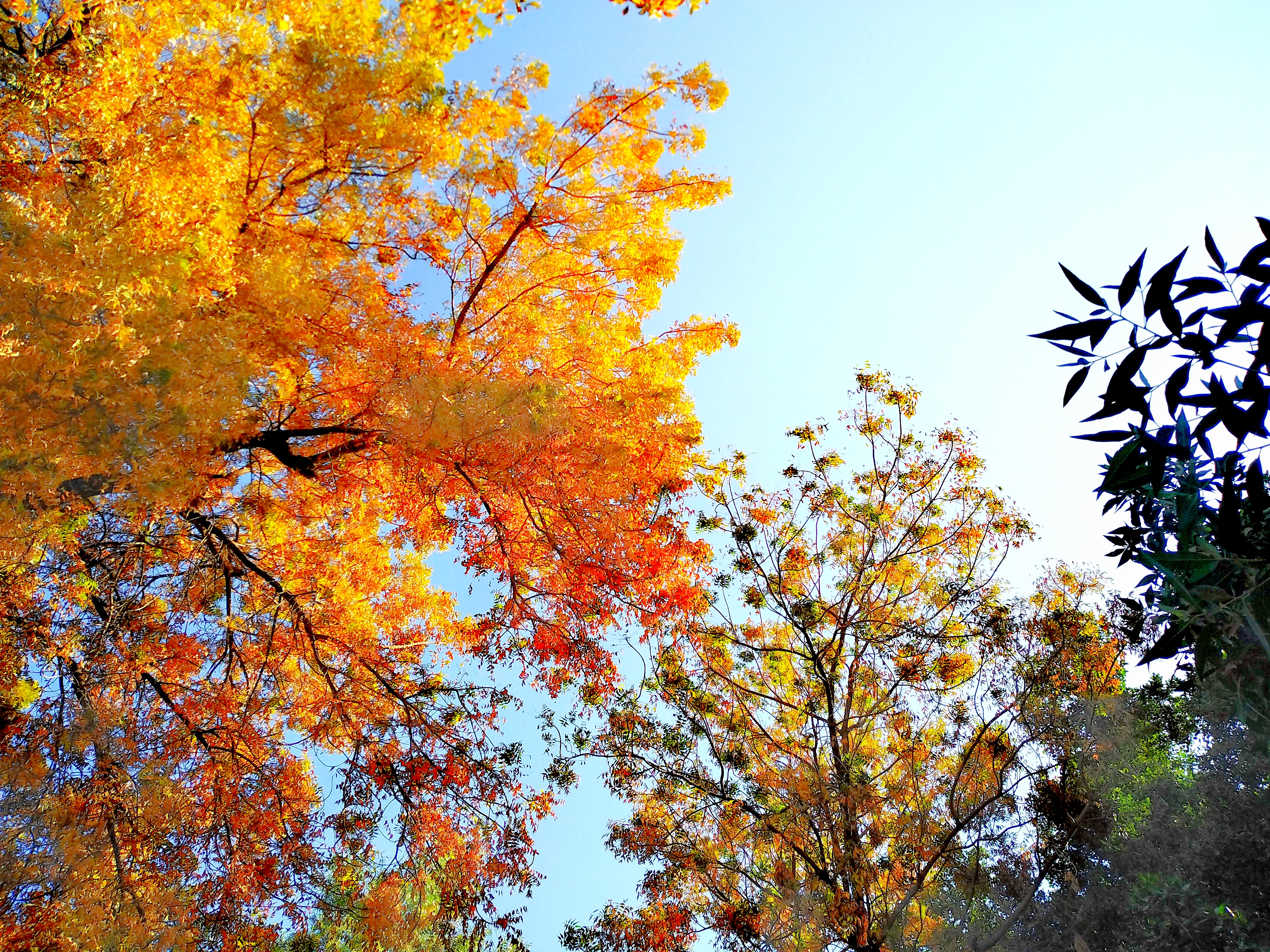
End of Rainy Seasons in Kassala

Kassala has a hot desert climate (Köppen climate classification BWh) characterized by high temperatures, low precipitation, and abundant sunshine. April through June marks the hottest period of the year, followed by the wet season from July through September, marked by higher humidity levels and intermittent rainfall. The rest of the year is very dry, with nearly no precipitation from November to March.

Climate data for Kassala (1991–2020 normals, extremes 1901–present)
Month	Jan	Feb	Mar	Apr	May	Jun	Jul	Aug	Sep	Oct	Nov	Dec	Year
Record high °C (°F)	41.7 (107.1)	44.5 (112.1)	45.5 (113.9)	46.5 (115.7)	47 (117)	47.6 (117.7)	43 (109)	41.6 (106.9)	43 (109)	47 (117)	42.7 (108.9)	40.5 (104.9)	47.6 (117.7)
Mean daily maximum °C (°F)	33.9 (93.0)	36.0 (96.8)	38.6 (101.5)	41.0 (105.8)	41.7 (107.1)	40.0 (104.0)	36.6 (97.9)	34.6 (94.3)	36.9 (98.4)	38.9 (102.0)	37.5 (99.5)	35.1 (95.2)	37.6 (99.7)
Daily mean °C (°F)	25.7 (78.3)	27.4 (81.3)	29.9 (85.8)	32.8 (91.0)	34.2 (93.6)	33.2 (91.8)	30.4 (86.7)	28.9 (84.0)	30.6 (87.1)	31.9 (89.4)	30.0 (86.0)	27.1 (80.8)	30.2 (86.4)
Mean daily minimum °C (°F)	17.4 (63.3)	18.8 (65.8)	21.1 (70.0)	24.5 (76.1)	26.7 (80.1)	26.3 (79.3)	24.2 (75.6)	23.3 (73.9)	24.3 (75.7)	24.9 (76.8)	22.4 (72.3)	19.1 (66.4)	22.7 (72.9)
Record low °C (°F)	5.0 (41.0)	5 (41)	8.9 (48.0)	11.1 (52.0)	16.2 (61.2)	18.5 (65.3)	17 (63)	17.2 (63.0)	17.5 (63.5)	15.7 (60.3)	11.1 (52.0)	6.4 (43.5)	5 (41)
Average precipitation mm (inches)	0.0 (0.0)	0.0 (0.0)	0.1 (0.00)	2.1 (0.08)	12.9 (0.51)	19.2 (0.76)	68.6 (2.70)	88.0 (3.46)	42.4 (1.67)	5.4 (0.21)	0.2 (0.01)	0.0 (0.0)	238.9 (9.41)
Average precipitation days (≥ 1.0 mm)	0.0	0.0	0.0	0.6	2.0	1.9	5.4	7.0	3.3	1.0	0.1	0.0	21.4
Average relative humidity (%)	42	38	29	26	29	37	53	61	52	40	38	43	41
Average dew point °C (°F)	11.8 (53.2)	10.8 (51.4)	9.9 (49.8)	10.7 (51.3)	13.6 (56.5)	16.5 (61.7)	19.7 (67.5)	20.6 (69.1)	19.6 (67.3)	16.6 (61.9)	14.1 (57.4)	13.4 (56.1)	14.8 (58.6)
Mean monthly sunshine hours	310.0	285.6	306.9	297.0	297.6	276.0	241.8	238.7	276.0	303.8	303.0	313.1	3,449.5
Source 1: NOAA
Source 2: Meteo Climat (record highs and lows)

== Current status ==
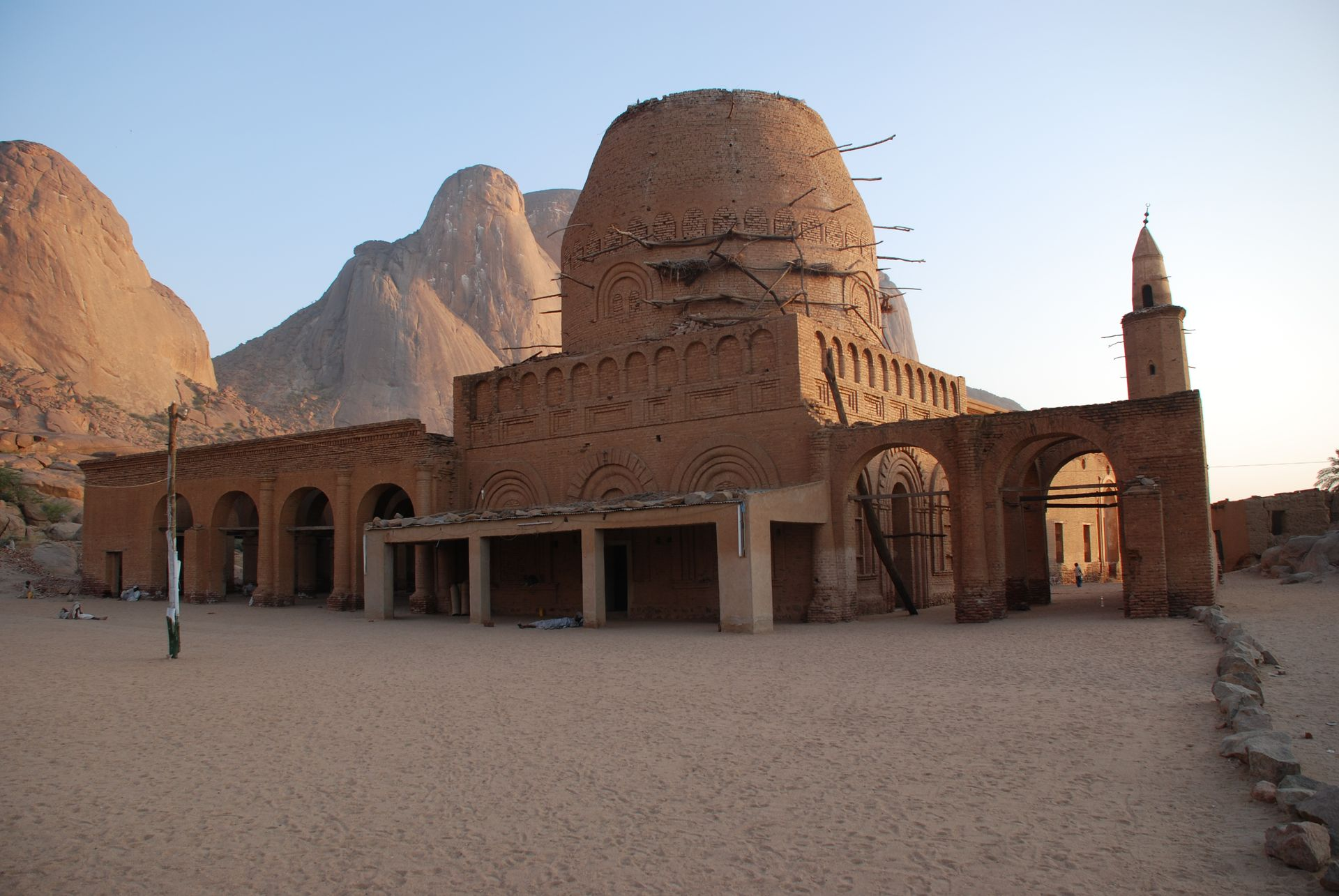
The Khatmiyya Mosque and Khatmiyya Hasan tomb

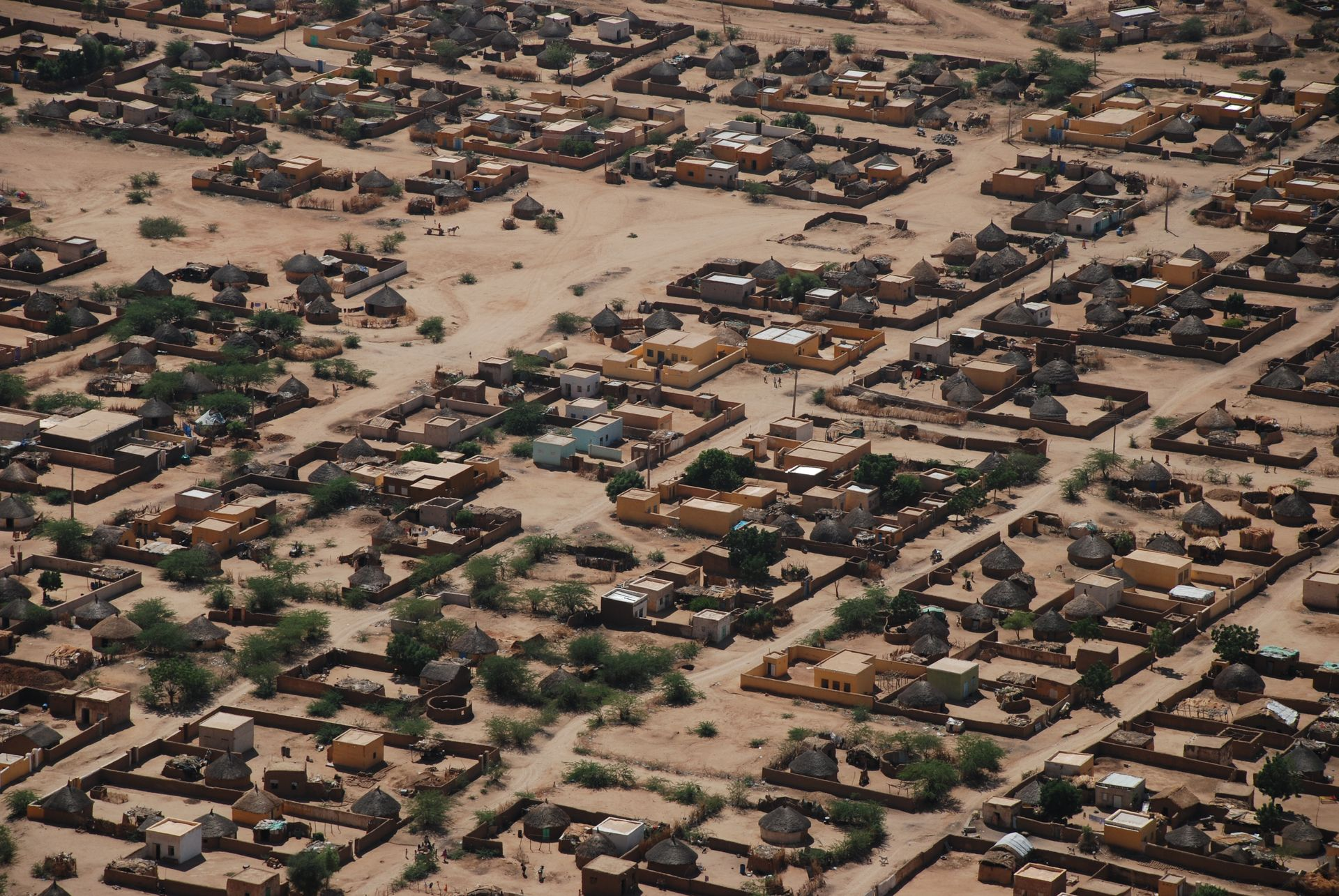
Mukram suburb

The Kassala region had a child mortality rate of 62 deaths per 1,000 live births in 2014, slightly higher than the national average of 52 child deaths per 1,000.

The Khatmiyya Mosque, built in 1840 by the Egyptians and damaged during the Mahdist War, is the city's most important cultural site. It is an important site for the Sufi Khatmiyya order.

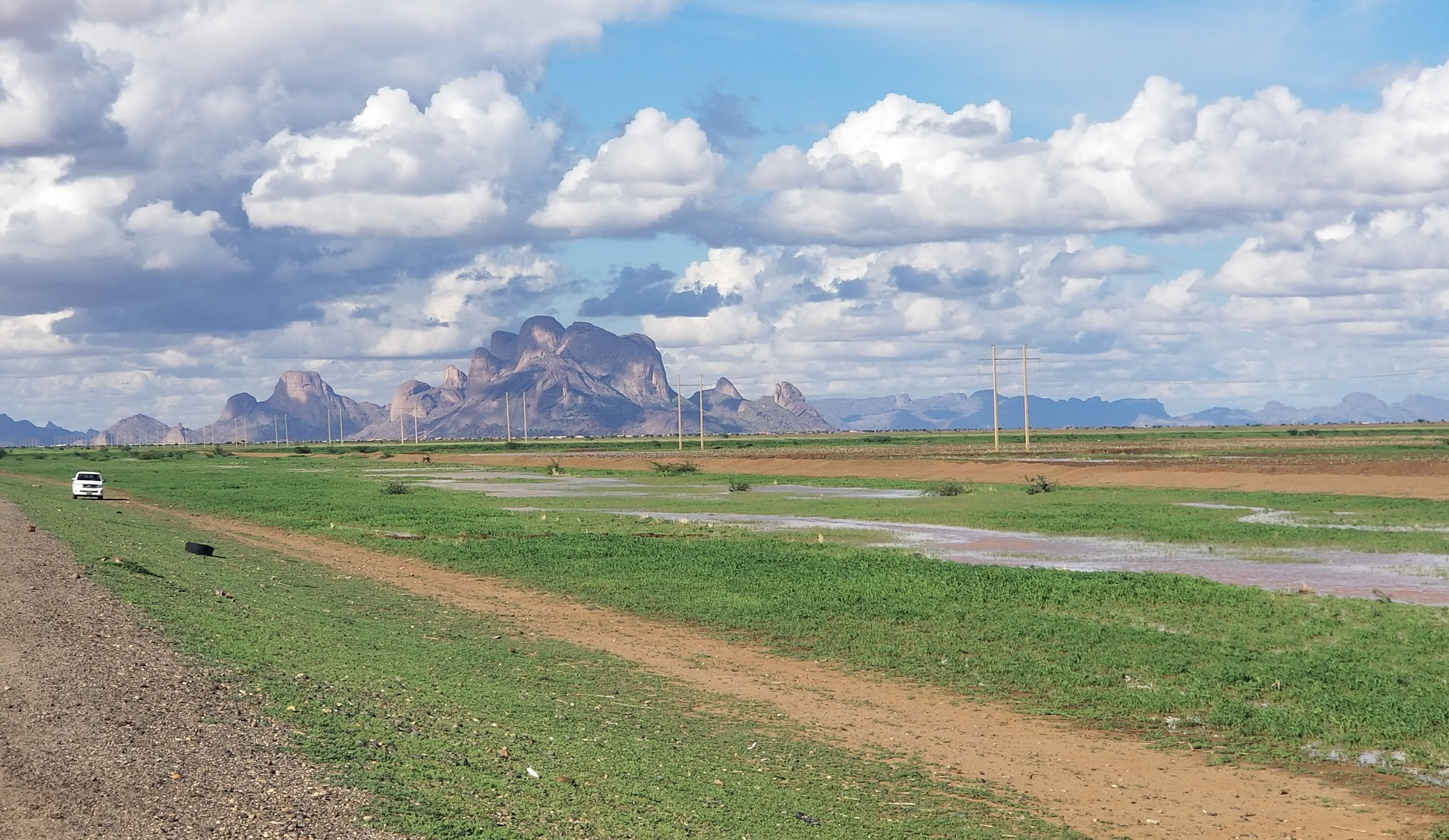
The Eastern side of Kassala

== Education ==
The city is home to Kassala University, a public university established in 1990 to replace the East University, and an important institution for development in the east of Sudan. Including Faculty of Medicine and Health Sciences, Faculty of Education, Faculty of Economic and Administration, Faculty of Computer science and IT and more.

== Notable people ==
- Bushara Abdel-Nadief (footballer)
- Aisha Musa Ahmad (singer)
- Hassan Al-Turabi (politician)
- Muhannad El Tahir (footballer)
- Nizar Hamid (footballer)
- Noor Uthman Muhammed

== See also ==
- 2007 Sudan floods
- Railway stations in Sudan
- Toteil
- Dar Erenga
