= Resonant column test =

The resonant column test is used to determine the shear or elastic modulus and damping characteristics of soils based on the theory of wave propagation in prismatic rods. Details on this theory can be found in Richart et al. (1970)(chapter 3). Both solid and hollow specimens can be used with this equipment.
