= Calciorthid =

Type of soil

Calciorthid is the taxonomic classification of soils possessing the following properties:

- Yellowish to grey colour. (The overall grey colour reflects the deficiency of organic matter)
- Poor in nitrogen, phosphorus and potash
- Is alkaline, with pH ranging from 7.8 to 8.5.
- Are sandy loam to silt in mixture

In the U.S. Soil Taxonomy, they fall under the Aridisols (dry soils) and are distinguished by a calcic horizon where calcium carbonate has accumulated.
