= Digital soil mapping =

Computer-assisted production of maps of soil properties

Digital soil mapping (DSM) in soil science, also referred to as predictive soil mapping or pedometric mapping, is the computer-assisted production of digital maps of soil types and soil properties. Soil mapping, in general, involves the creation and population of spatial soil information by the use of field and laboratory observational methods coupled with spatial and non-spatial soil inference systems.

The international Working Group on Digital Soil Mapping (WG-DSM) defines digital soil mapping as "the creation and the population of a geographically referenced soil databases generated at a given resolution by using field and laboratory observation methods coupled with environmental data through quantitative relationships."

== Ambiguities ==
DSM can rely upon, but is considered to be distinct from traditional soil mapping, which involves manual delineation of soil boundaries by field soil scientists. Non-digital soil maps produced as result of manual delineation of soil mapping units may also be digitized or surveyors may draw boundaries using field computers, hence both traditional, knowledge-based and technology and data-driven soil mapping frameworks are in essence digital. Unlike traditional soil mapping, digital soil mapping is, however, considered to make an extensive use of:

1. technological advances, including GPS receivers, field scanners, and remote sensing, and
2. computational advances, including geostatistical interpolation and inference algorithms, GIS, digital elevation model, and data mining

In digital soil mapping, semi-automated techniques and technologies are used to acquire, process and visualize information on soils and auxiliary information, so that the result can be obtained at cheaper costs. Products of the data-driven or statistical soil mapping are commonly assessed for the accuracy and uncertainty and can be more easily updated when new information comes available.

Digital soil mapping tries to overcome some of the drawbacks of the traditional soil maps that are often only focused on delineating soil-classes i.e. soil types. Such traditional soil maps:

- do not provide information for modeling the dynamics of soil conditions and
- are inflexible to quantitative studies on the functionality of soils.

An example of successful digital soil mapping application is the physical properties (soil texture, bulk density) developed in the European Union with around 20,000 topsoil samples of LUCAS database. Another example are maps of soil properties for the entire world (250 m cell size), with quantified uncertainty, generated by ISRIC - World Soil Information using state-of-the-art machine learning methods (SoilGrids) that use as inputs point data from a large global soil profile database (WoSIS) and over 400 global environmental covariates.

== Scorpan ==
Scorpan is a mnemonic for an empirical quantitative descriptions of relationships between soil and environmental factors with a view to using these as soil spatial prediction functions for the purpose of Digital soil mapping. It is an adaptation of Hans Jenny's five factors not for explanation of soil formation, but for empirical descriptions of relationships between soil and other spatially referenced factors.

S = f(s,c,o,r,p,a,n), where

- S = soil classes or attributes (to be modeled)
- f = function
- s = soil, other or previously measured properties of the soil at a point
- c = climate, climatic properties of the environment at a point
- o = organisms, including land cover and natural vegetation or fauna or human activity
- r = relief, topography, landscape attributes
- p = parent material, lithology
- a = age, the time factor
- n = spatial or geographic position

== See also ==
- Pedometric mapping – Statistical method for studying soil
- SSURGO – Soil Survey Geographic database
