= Soil survey =

Soil classification process

Soil survey, or soil mapping, is the process of classifying soil types and other soil properties in a given area and geo-encoding such information.

== Background ==
Soil surveys apply the principles of soil science and draw heavily from geomorphology, theories of soil formation, physical geography, and analysis of vegetation and land use patterns. Primary data for the soil survey are acquired by field sampling and by remote sensing. Remote sensing principally uses aerial photography, but LiDAR and other digital techniques are steadily gaining in popularity. In the past, a soil scientist would take hard-copies of aerial photography, topographic maps, and mapping keys into the field with them. Today, a growing number of soil scientists bring a ruggedized tablet computer and GPS into the field with them. The tablet may be loaded with digital aerial photos, LiDAR, topography, soil geodatabases, mapping keys, and more.

== Publication ==
The term soil survey may also be used as a noun to describe the published results. In the United States, these surveys were once published in book form for individual counties by the National Cooperative Soil Survey. Today, soil surveys are no longer published in book form; they are published to the web and accessed on NRCS Web Soil Survey where a person can create a custom soil survey. This allows for rapid flow of the latest soil information to the user. In the past it could take years to publish a paper soil survey. Today it takes only moments for changes to go live to the public. The most current soil survey data is made available for high end GIS users such as professional consulting companies and universities.

Typical information in a published county soil survey includes the following:

- a brief overview on how to use the survey
- a general soil map for comparing the sustainability of large sections of the county
- a detailed map with specific soil series outlined and indexed
- a section on the use and management of soils
- tables describing the physical features and environment of the county
- tables containing land use suitability based on standards set by the Natural Resources Conservation Service.

== Uses ==
The information in a soil survey can be used by farmers and ranchers to help determine whether a particular soil type is suited for crops or livestock and what type of soil management might be required. An architect or engineer might use the engineering properties of a soil to determine whether it is suitable for a certain type of construction. A homeowner may even use the information for maintaining or constructing their garden, yard, or home.

Soil survey information can be used to predict or estimate the potentials and limitations of soils for many specific uses. A soil survey includes an important part of the information that is used to make workable plans for land management. The information must be interpreted to be usable by professional planners and others. Predictions based on soil surveys serve as a basis for judgment about land use and management for areas ranging from small tracts to regions of several million acres. These predictions, however, must be evaluated along with economic, social, and environmental considerations before they can be used to make valid recommendations for land use and management.

== See also ==
- FAO soil classification
- USDA soil taxonomy
- Pedometrics
- Earth sciences survey
- Digital soil mapping
