= Retisol =

A Retisol is a Reference Soil Group of the World Reference Base for Soil Resources (WRB). Retisols are characterized by clay migration and an additional specific feature: The clay-poorer and lighter coloured eluvial horizon intercalates netlike into the clay-richer more intensely coloured illuvial horizon. The illuvial horizon is the diagnostic argic horizon, and the intercalation is called retic properties (Latin: rete = net).

Retisols were newly introduced with the third edition of the WRB in 2014. They include the narrower defined Albeluvisols of the first and second edition (1998 and 2006), which were abolished in 2014. The definition of the Retisols resembles the definition of the Podzoluvisols of the Legend (1974) and the Revised Legend (1988) of the FAO soil classification.

== Horizonation ==
A typical horizon sequence according to Annex 3 of the WRB is:

- A – mineral topsoil, usually with relatively low organic matter concentrations
- E – horizon that lost clay (eluvial horizon)
- Bt/E – intercalating eluvial/illuvial horizon (argic horizon with retic properties)
- Bt – horizon that gained clay (illuvial horizon, argic horizon)
- C – more or less unweathered material (parent material)

== Occurrence and use ==
Retisols occur mainly in periglacial areas of the last glaciation in Europe and North America. In Europe, they are found along a belt from Belgium through northern Germany, Poland and Belarus to Russia. Because the very specific retic properties are not so widespread, they normally do not cover larger areas.

Most Retisols are dominated by high-activity clays and show a low base saturation. Many are used as forest or pasture land. Especially their physical conditions are not good for agriculture. The topsoils are often poor in clay minerals and iron oxides. In the subsoil, the rainwater runs downwards predominantly in the clay-poorer parts, whereas the clay-richer and therefore also nutrient-richer parts are often insufficiently humid. The clay-richer parts are relatively dense and difficult to be rooted. These characteristics make the Retisols also unattractive for many soil animals, especially earthworms. Retisols have typically sandy or silty topsoils that are prone to erosion.

== Relationships with other Reference Soil Groups ==
The WRB defines five Reference soil Groups with a compulsory argic horizon. Only the Retisols have retic properties. The other four are differentiated according to the cation exchange capacity per kg clay at pH 7 (CEC / kg clay) in the argic horizon and according to the base saturation calculated per sum of exchangeable cations (BSeff) in the subsoil. For Luvisols both values are high. Alisols have a high CEC and a low BS. Lixisols have a low CEC and a high BS. For Acrisols both values are low. Soils with an argic horizon and retic properties that are dominated by stagnant water are classified as Retic Stagnosols.
