= Ultisol =

Soil type

- Red Clay Soil
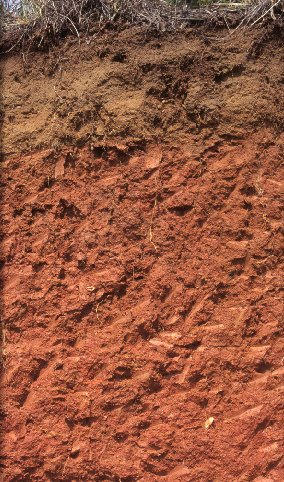
- A Ultisol profile
- Used in: USDA soil taxonomy
- Key process: weathering
- Climate: tropical, humid subtropical, oceanic

Ultisol, commonly known as red clay soil, is one of twelve soil orders in the United States Department of Agriculture soil taxonomy. The word "Ultisol" is derived from "ultimate", because Ultisols were seen as the ultimate product of continuous weathering of minerals in a humid, temperate climate without new soil formation via glaciation. They are defined as mineral soils which contain no calcareous (calcium carbonate containing) material anywhere within the soil, have less than 10% weatherable minerals in the extreme top layer of soil, and have less than 35% base saturation throughout the soil. Ultisols occur in humid temperate or tropical regions. While the term is usually applied to the red clay soils of the Southern United States, Ultisols are also found in regions of Africa, Asia, Australia and South America.

In the World Reference Base for Soil Resources (WRB), most Ultisols are known as Acrisols and Alisols. Some belong to the Retisols or to the Nitisols. Aquults are typically Stagnosols or Planosols. Humults may be Umbrisols.

== Introduction ==
Ultisols vary in color from purplish-red, to a bright reddish-orange, to pale yellowish-orange and (in cooler areas such as Pennsylvania) even some subdued yellowish-brown or grayish-brown tones. They are typically quite acidic, often having a pH of less than 5. The red and yellow colors result from the accumulation of iron oxide (rust), which is highly insoluble in water. Major nutrients, such as calcium and potassium, are typically deficient in Ultisols, which means they generally cannot be used for sedentary agriculture without the aid of lime and other fertilizers, such as superphosphate. They can be easily exhausted, and require more careful management than Alfisols or Mollisols. However, they can be cultivated over a relatively wide range of moisture conditions. Where the organic matter content is high, as in Humults like the Olympic series, the soil is relatively fertile.

Ultisols can have a variety of clay minerals, but in many cases the dominant mineral is kaolinite. This clay has good bearing capacity and no shrink–swell property. Consequently, well-drained kaolinitic Ultisols such as the Cecil series are suitable for urban development.

Ultisols are the dominant soils in the Southern United States (where the Cecil series is most famous), southeastern China, Southeast Asia, and some other subtropical and tropical areas. Their northern limit (except fossil soils) is very sharply defined in North America by the limits of maximum glaciation during the Pleistocene, because Ultisols typically take hundreds of thousands of years to form—far longer than the length of an interglacial period today.

The oldest fossil Ultisols are known from the Carboniferous period when forests first developed. Though known from far north of their present range as recently as the Miocene, Ultisols are surprisingly rare as fossils overall, since they would have been expected to be very common in the warm Mesozoic and Tertiary paleoclimates.

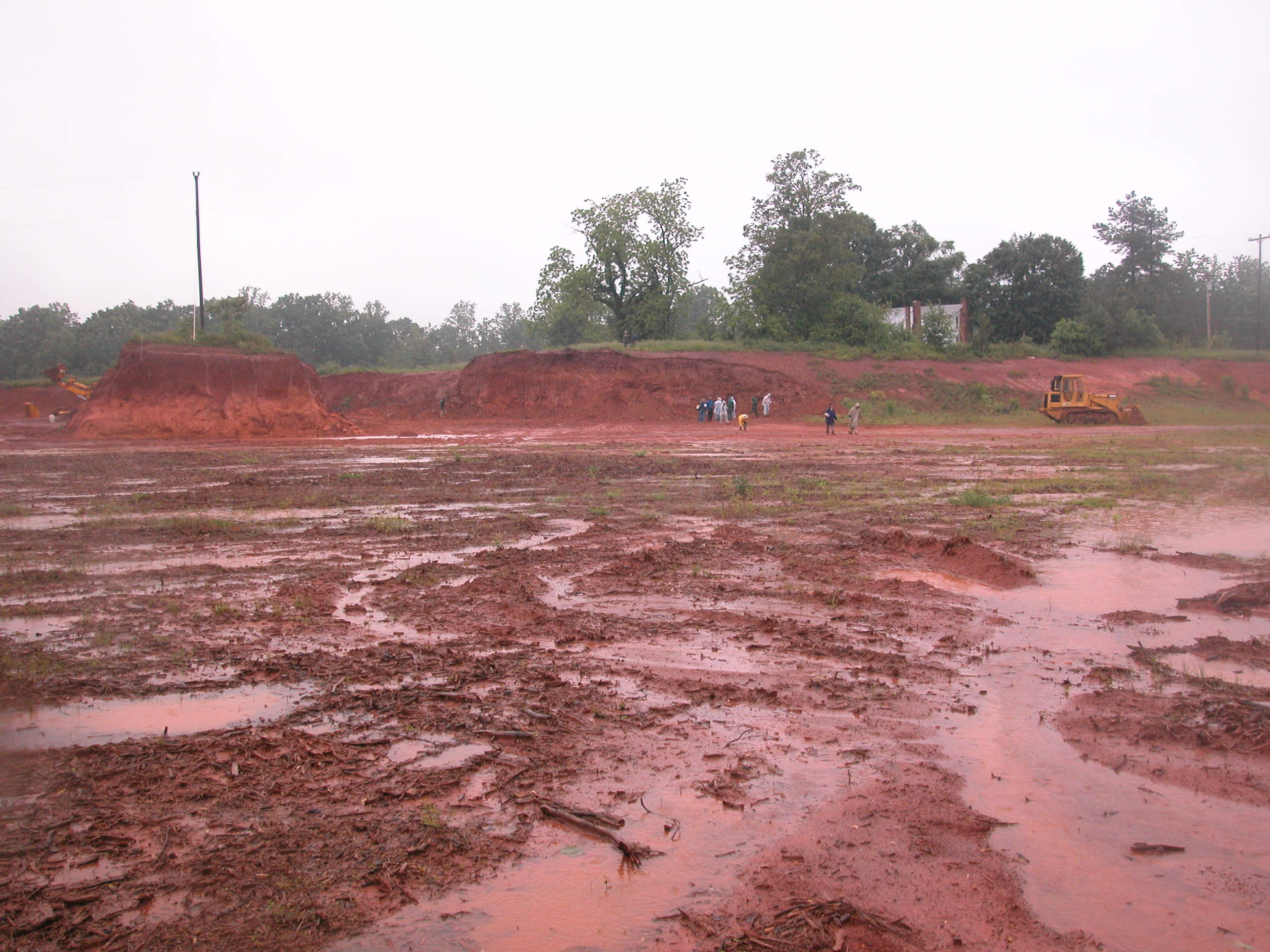
Red clay soil is common throughout the Southern United States, especially around the Piedmont. This photo was taken in North Carolina.

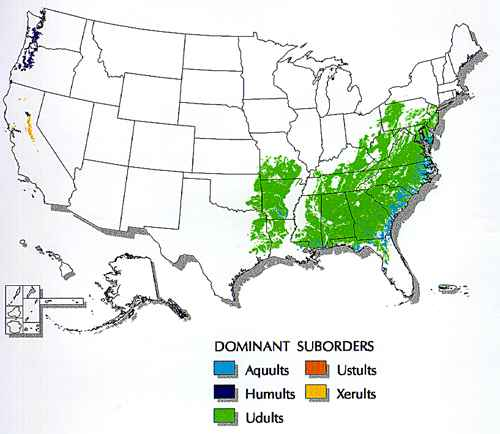
Map showing distribution and types of Ultisols throughout the United States; there is no Ultisol on the Ohio River flood plains, as the river has historically deposited other soil types there during its regular natural flooding.

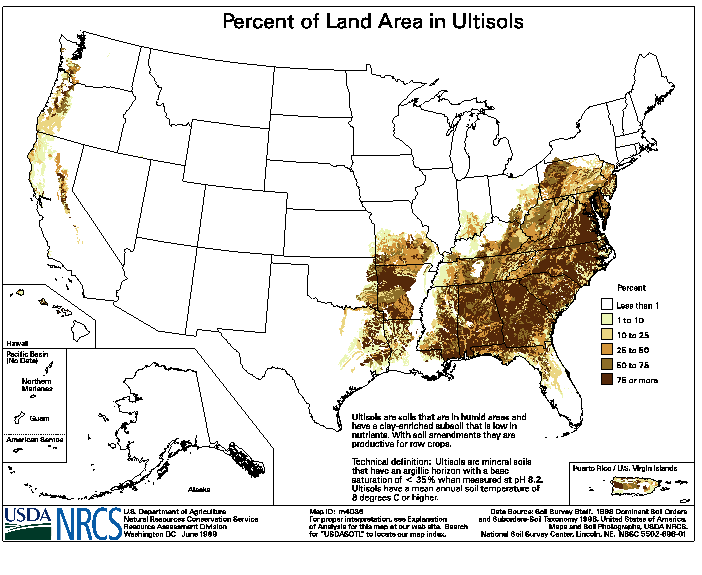
Map of the United States showing what percentage of the soil in a given area is classified as an Ultisol-type soil. The great majority of the land area classified in the highest category (75%-or-greater Ultisol) lies in the South and overlays with the Piedmont Plateau, which runs as a diagonal line through the South from southeast (in Alabama) to northwest (up into parts of Maryland).

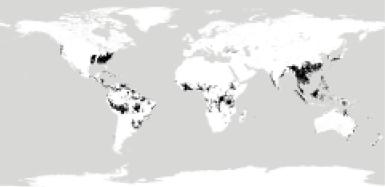
Utlisols of the world

== Gardening in Ultisol ==
The lack of organic matter in Ultisol makes it difficult for plants to grow without proper care and considerations. Soil amendments are generally required each year in order to sustain flourishing plant life in regions with primarily Ultisol soil. The use of soil tests, coupled with the corresponding provisions, can alleviate issues of nutrition and irrigation that can result from non porous Ultisol. Soil tests help indicate the pH, and red clay soil typically has a low pH. The addition of lime is used to help to increase the pH in soil and can help increase the pH in Ultisol as well.

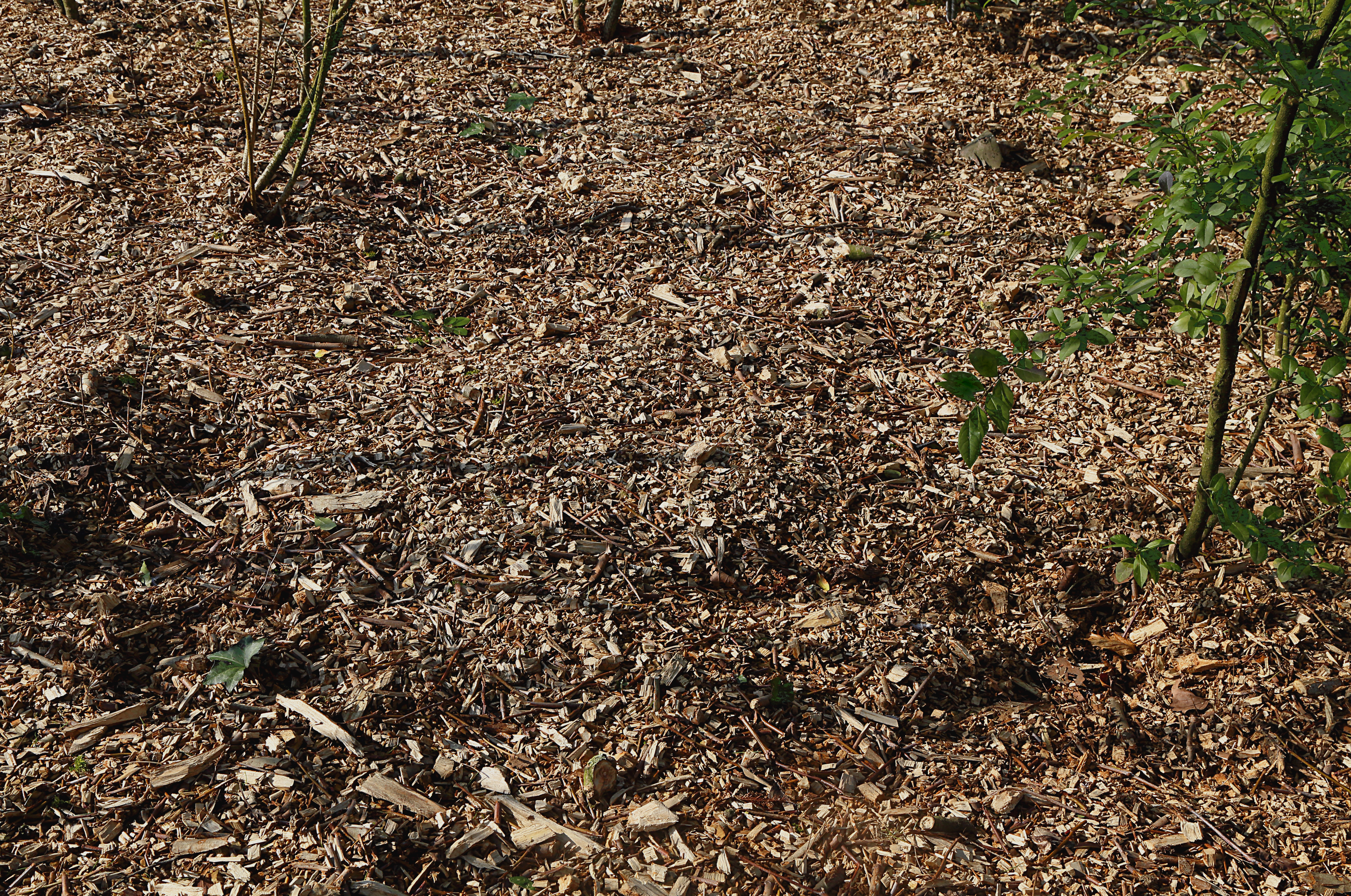
Mulch can be used to help improve Ultisol

=== Possible solutions ===
Generally, gardeners aim to have 45% mineral, 5% organic matter and 50% pore space in their soil. The composition of Ultisol in North Carolina, for reference, is approximately 16% pore space, 2% organic matter and 82% mineral. The use of mulch is widespread in the Piedmont region of the United States as a solution to the high temperatures and saturation of the soil. The addition of mulch helps to make the soil more porous.

Adding manure and compost can help boost the amount of organic material present in the soil, which in turn helps add essential nutrients. Specifically, adding a 2- to 3-inch layer of compost and manure should be mixed into the soil to match a shovel's depth. The addition of organic material also helps to improve the drainage, while decreasing the overall weight of the soil.

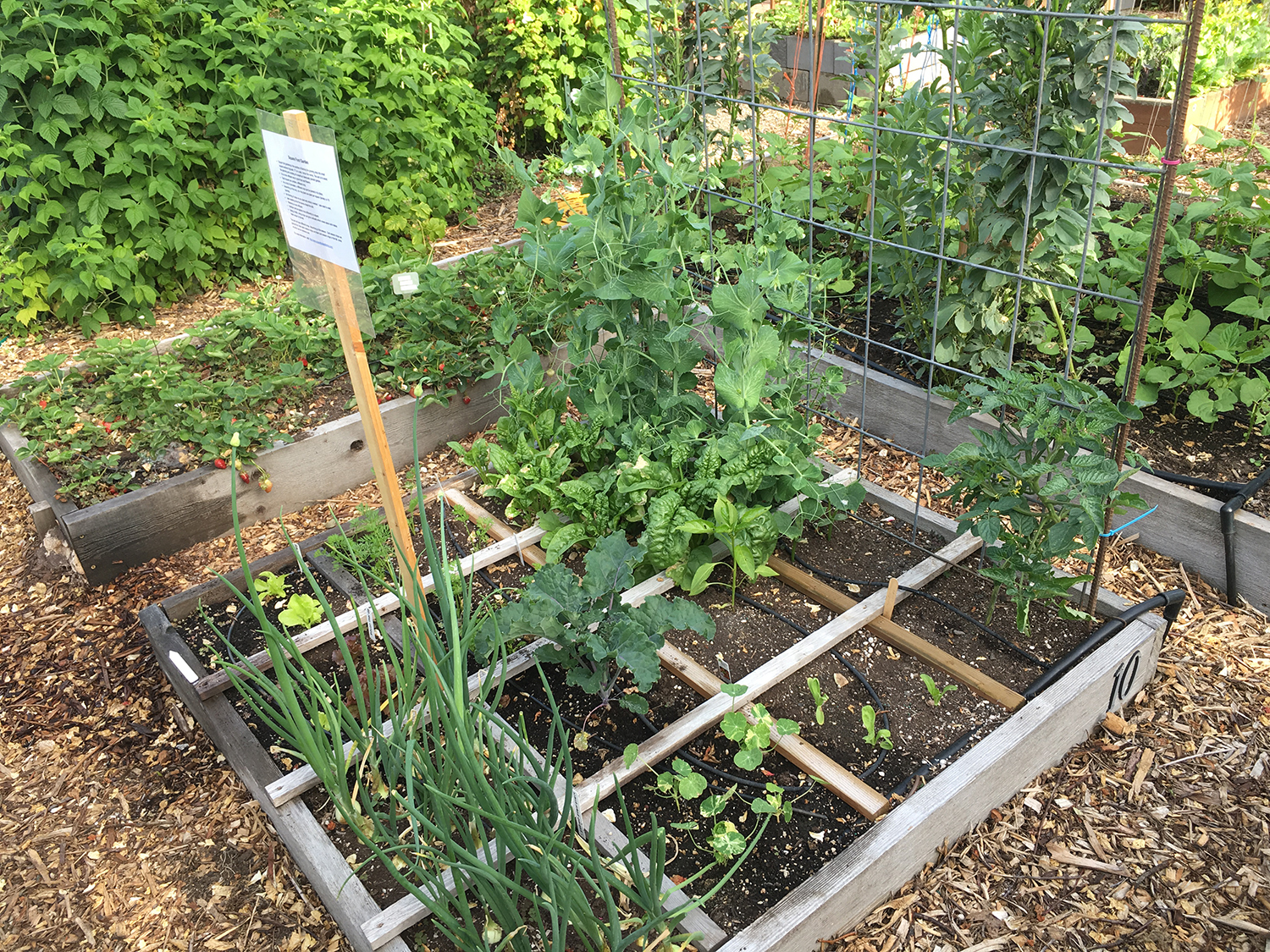
A garden planted in a raised bed

However, microorganisms in the soil consume the same nutrients that plants use to grow so certain nutrients will remain unavailable to plants until the microorganisms completely break down the organic material and release nutrients. Living organisms within the soil use, and subsequently convert, organic material into usable humus. To avoid the delay presented by this process, adding manure in the fall is advisable.

Some gardeners who live in areas with large amounts of red clay soil use raised beds or Hügelkultur to avoid having to amend the soil. By using raised beds, gardeners avoid having to deal with Ultisols altogether.

=== Planting in Ultisol ===
Plants found native to regions with high amounts of Ultisol can thrive. Generally, these species adapt to poorly drained, damp soils. The Missouri Botanical Garden recommends tickweed, spotted jewelweed, mealycup sage, Camassia, spring starflower, ostrich fern, sideoats grama, Bouteloua curtipendula, and prairie dropseed.

== Suborders ==
- Aquults: Ultisols with a water table at or near the surface for much of the year
- Humults: well-drained Ultisols that have high organic matter content
- Udults: Ultisols of humid climates
- Ustults: Ultisols of semiarid and subhumid climates
- Xerults: temperate Ultisols with arid summers and moist winters

== See also ==
- Soil formation
- Pedology
- Soil classification
- Red soil
- Kurosol
