= Soil in Sa'isi Tsa'ida Imba =

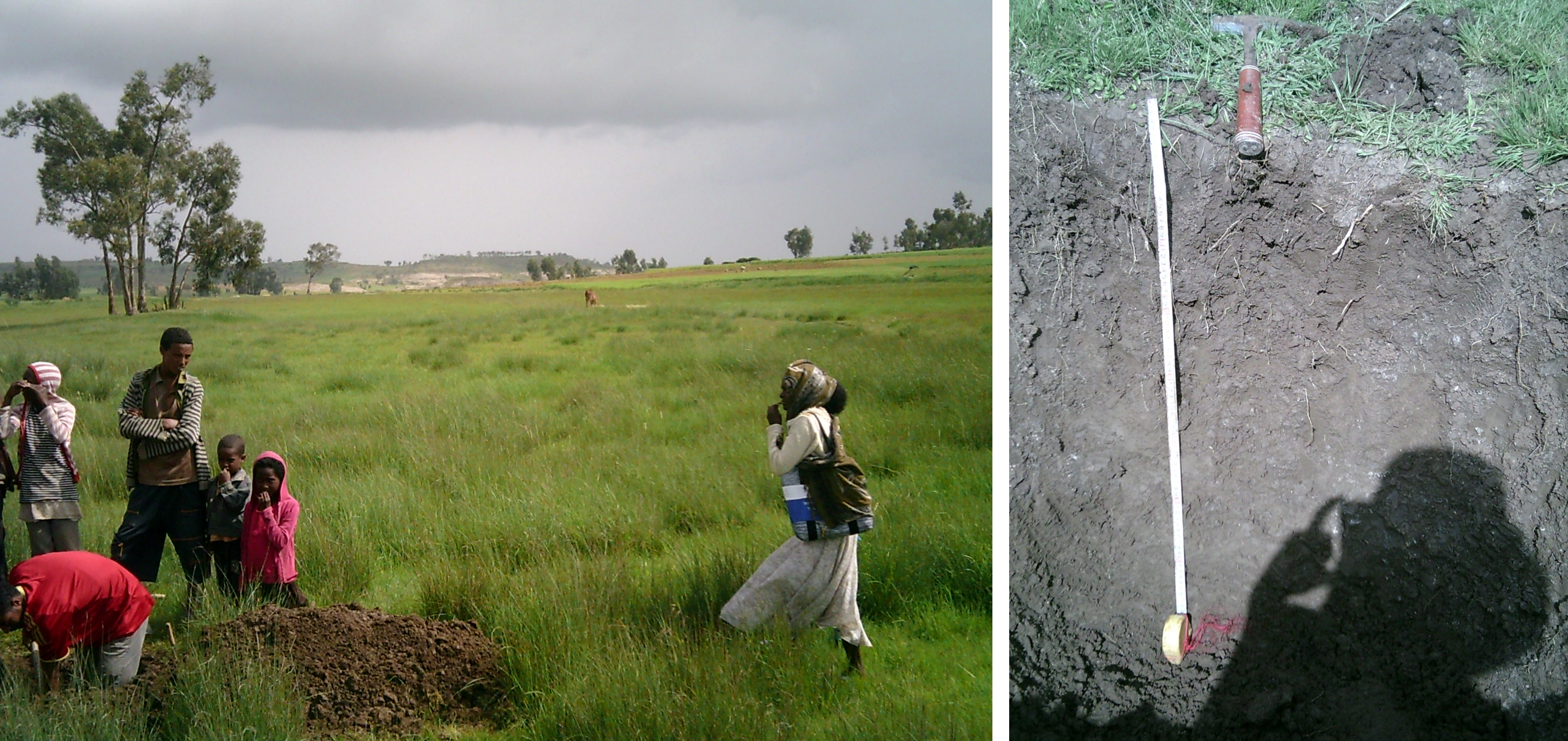
Mazic Sodic Vertisol in the Sinkata midlands

The soils of the Sa'isi Tsa'ida Imba woreda (district) in Tigray (Ethiopia) reflect its longstanding agricultural history, highly seasonal rainfall regime, relatively low temperatures, overall dominance of metamorphic and sandstone lithology and steep slopes.

== Factors contributing to soil diversity ==
=== Climate ===
Annual rainfall depth is very variable with an average of around 600 mm. Most rains fall during the main rainy season, which typically extends from June to September. Mean temperature in woreda town Freweyni is 18.2 °C, oscillating between average daily minimum of 10.1 °C and maximum of 25.9 °C. The contrasts between day and night air temperatures are much larger than seasonal contrasts.

=== Geology ===
From the higher to the lower locations, the following geological formations are present:

- Adigrat Sandstone
- Enticho Sandstone
- Edaga Arbi Glacials
- Precambrian metamorphic rocks

=== Topography ===
As part of the Ethiopian Highlands the land has undergone a rapid tectonic uplift, leading the occurrence of mountain peaks, plateaus, valleys and gorges.

=== Land use ===
Generally speaking the level lands and intermediate slopes are occupied by cropland, while there is rangeland and shrubs on the steeper slopes. Remnant forests occur around Orthodox Christian churches and a few inaccessible places. A recent trend is the widespread planting of eucalyptus trees.

=== Environmental changes ===
Soil degradation in this district became important when humans started deforestation almost 5000 years ago. Depending on land use history, locations have been exposed in varying degrees to such land degradation.

== Geomorphic regions and soil units ==
Given the complex geology and topography of the district, it has been organised into land systems - areas with specific and unique geomorphic and geological characteristics, characterised by a particular soil distribution along the soil catena. Soil types are classified in line with World Reference Base for Soil Resources and reference made to main characteristics that can be observed in the field.

=== Idaga Hamus highlands ===
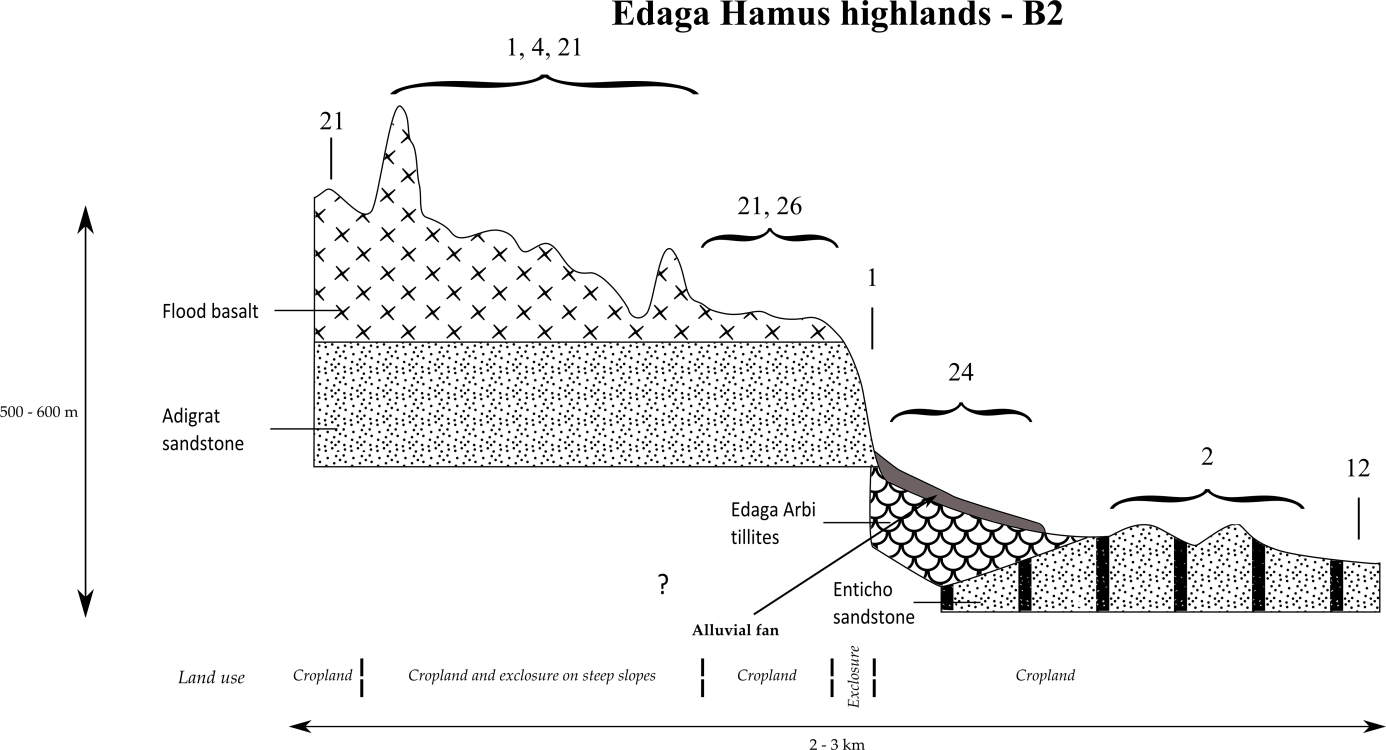
Typical catena in the Idaga Hamus highlands

- Associated soil types
  - shallow, very stony, silt loamy to loamy soils (Skeletic Cambisol, Leptic Cambisol, Skeletic Regosol) (4)
  - shallow, stony, dark greyish brown clay loams and sandy loams (Eutric Regosol and Cambisol) (21)
  - sandy clay loams to sands developed on sandy colluvium (Eutric Arenosol, Regosol, Cambisol) (24)
- Inclusions
  - complex of rock outcrops, very stony and very shallow soils ((Lithic) Leptosol) (1)
  - Deep dark cracking clays with very good natural fertility, waterlogged during the wet season (Chromic Vertisol, Pellic Vertisol) (12)
  - moderately deep, brown silty loamy to loamy soils (Eutric Luvisol) (26)

=== Enticho Sandstone plateau ===
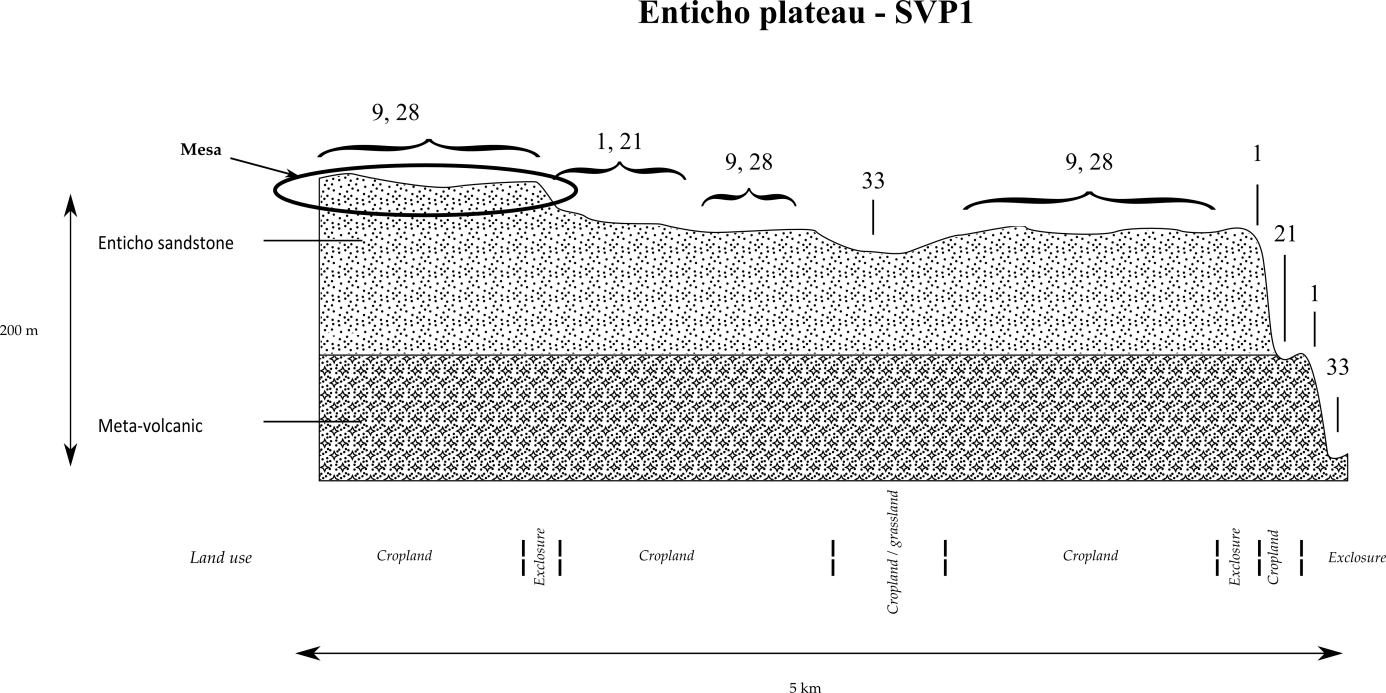
Typical catena on the Enticho sandstone plateau

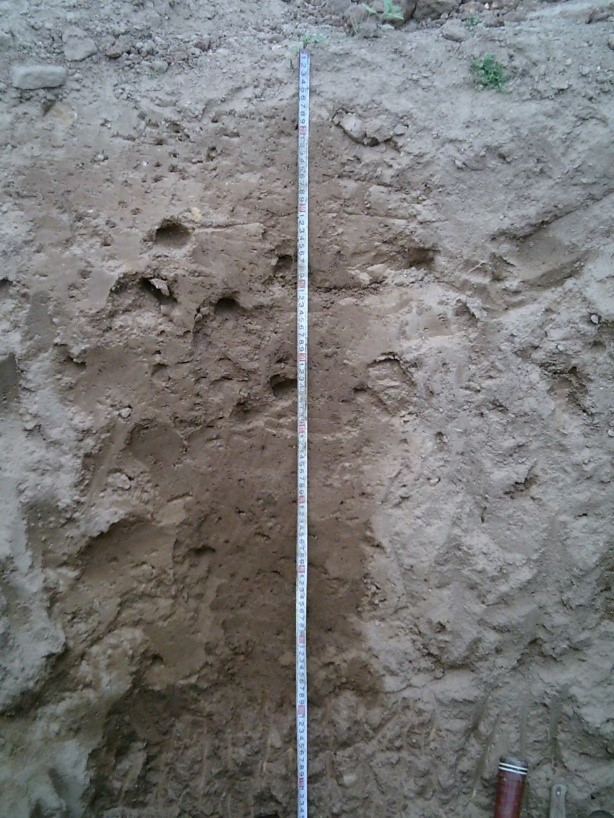
Arenic Lixisol profile

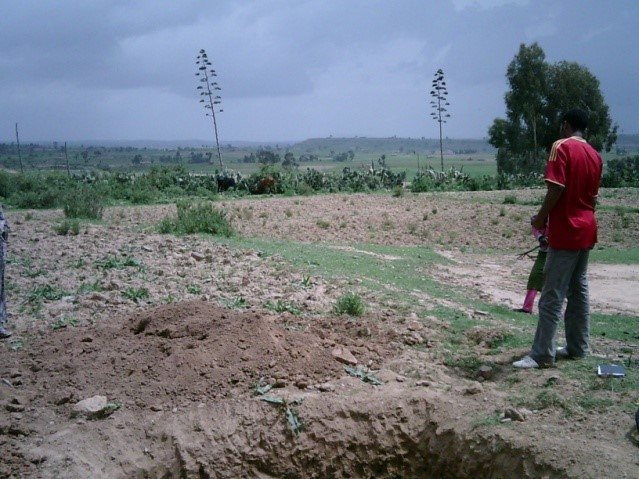
Arenic Lixisol in Sinkata

- Associated soil types
  - shallow sandy soils with an indurated layer which prevents rooting and drainage (Petric Plinthosol) (9)
  - moderately deep, (light) brown, loamy to loamy sandy soil (Chromic Cambisol, Arenic Luvisol, Arenic Lixisol) (28)
- Inclusions
  - complex of rock outcrops, very stony and very shallow soils ((Lithic) Leptosol) (1)
  - shallow, stony, dark greyish brown clay loams and sandy loams (Eutric Regosol and Cambisol) (21)
  - clays of floodplains with very high watertable with moderate to good natural fertility (Eutric Gleysol, Gleyic Cambisol) (33)

=== Mesa on the Enticho Sandstone plateau ===
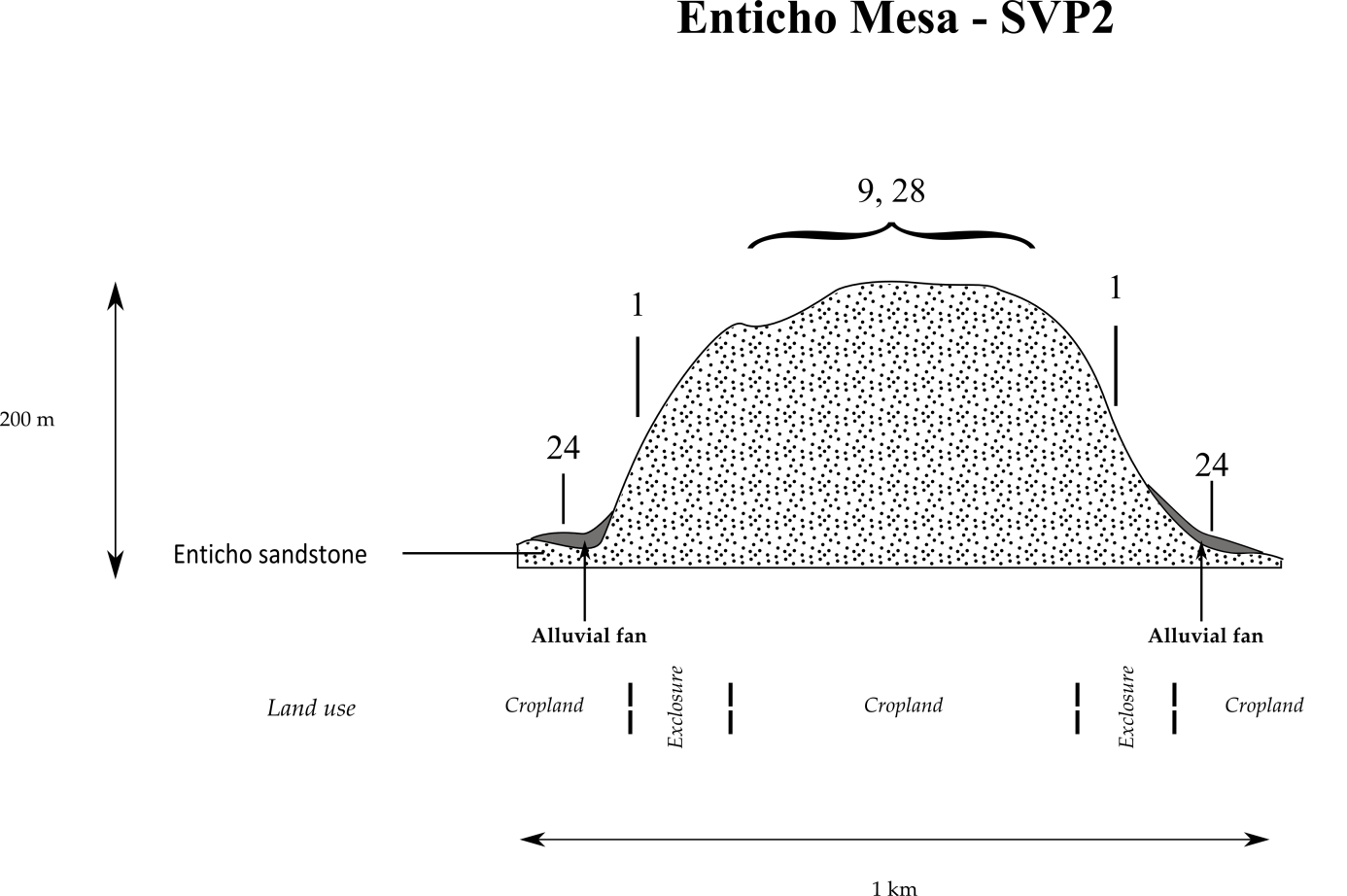
Typical catena on an Enticho sandstone mesa

- Associated soil types
  - shallow sandy soils with an indurated layer which prevents rooting and drainage (Petric Plinthosol) (9)
  - sandy clay loams to sands developed on sandy colluvium (Eutric Arenosol, Regosol, Cambisol) (24)
  - moderately deep, (light) brown, loamy to loamy sandy soil (Chromic Cambisol, Arenic Luvisol, Arenic Lixisol) (28)
- Inclusion: complex of rock outcrops, very stony and very shallow soils ((Lithic) Leptosol) (1)

=== Sinkata plain ===
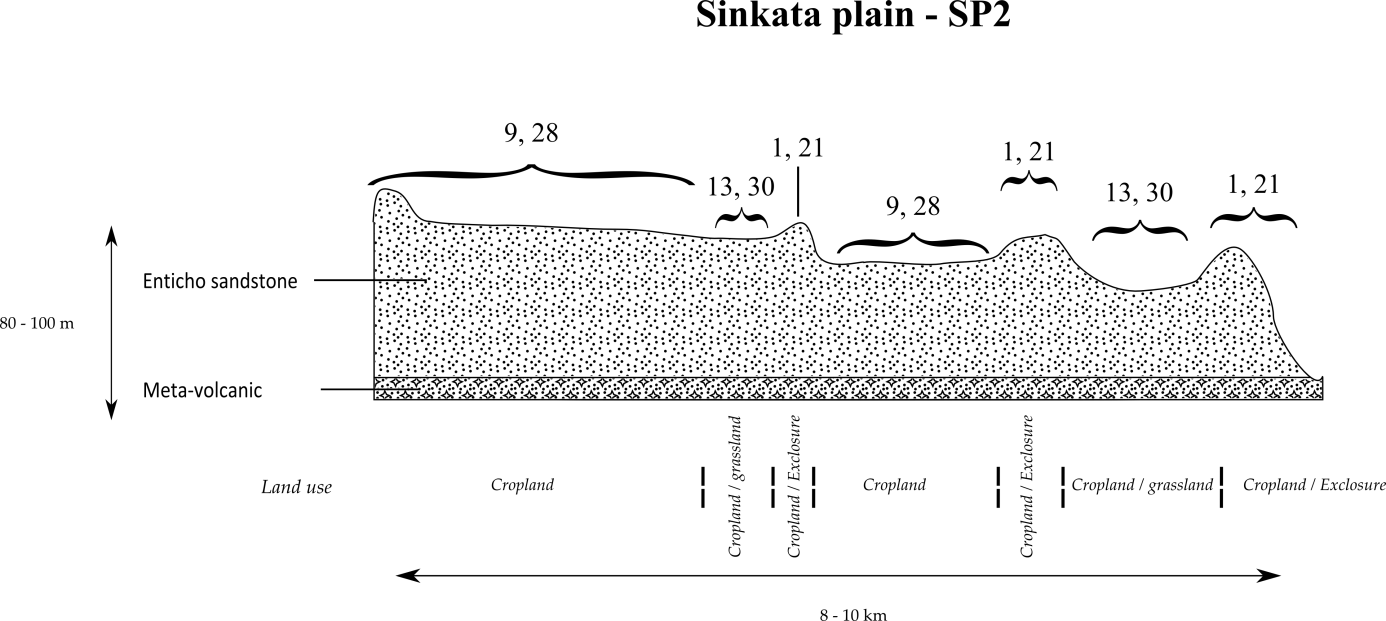
Typical catena in the Sinkata plain

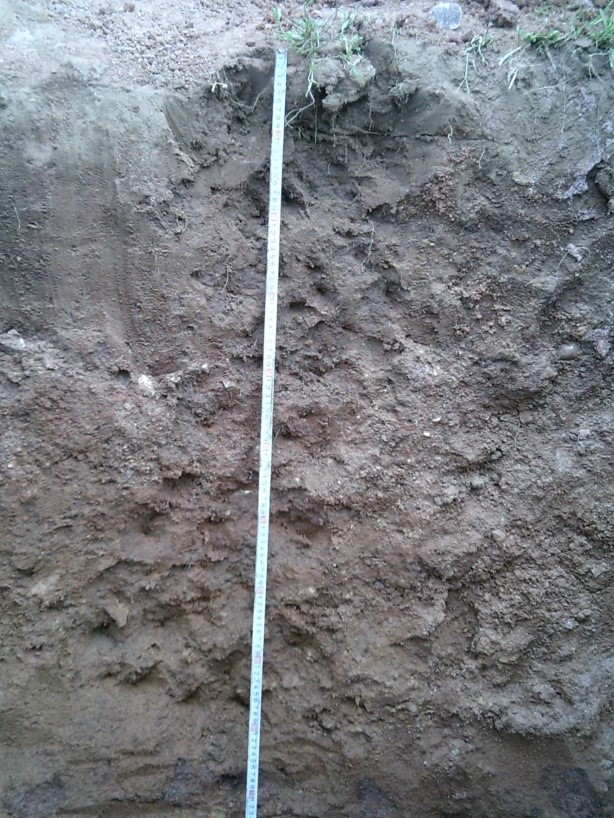
Haplic Fluvisol profile

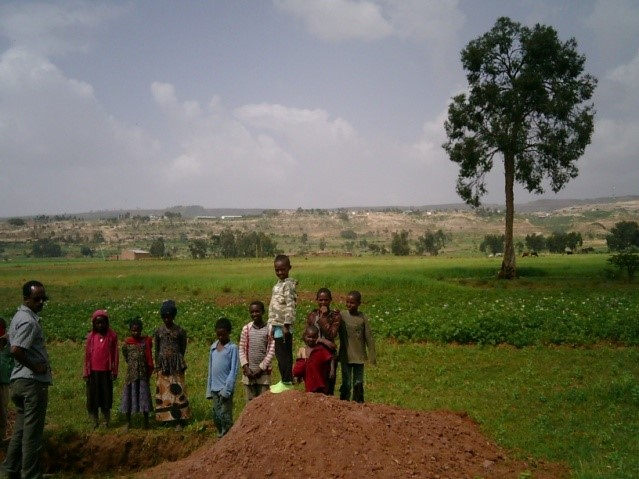
Haplic Fluvisol in Sinkata

- Associated soil types
  - shallow sandy soils with an indurated layer which prevents rooting and drainage (Petric Plinthosol) (9)
  - moderately deep, (light) brown, loamy to loamy sandy soil (Chromic Cambisol, Arenic Luvisol, Arenic Lixisol) (28)
- Inclusions
  - complex of rock outcrops, very stony and very shallow soils ((Lithic) Leptosol) (1)
  - shallow, stony loam soils (Eutric Regosol and Cambisol) (21)
  - deep, very hard cracking clays with good natural fertility, waterlogged during the wet season (Mazic (Sodic) Vertisol) (13)
  - brown to dark, silty clay loams to loamy sands developed on alluvium, with good natural fertility (Fluvisol) (30)

=== Suluh plains with metavolcanic rocks ===
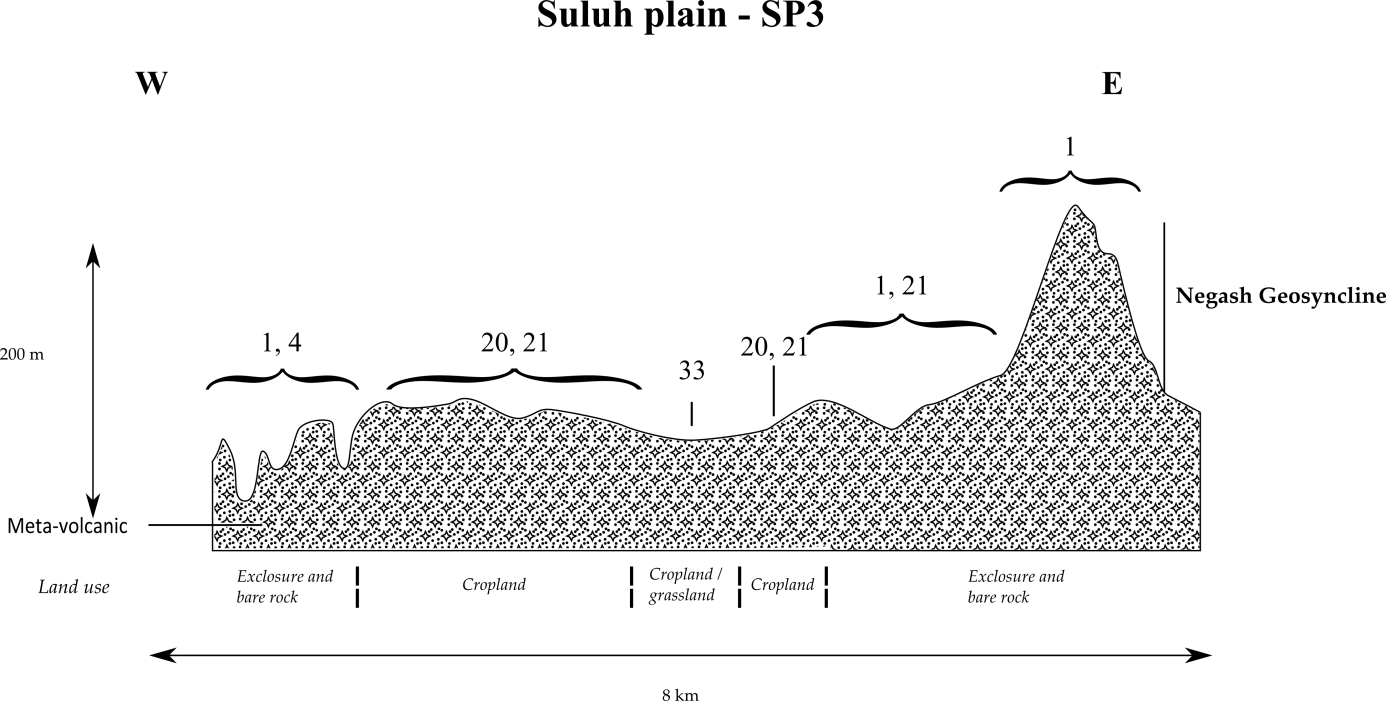
Typical catena in the Suluh plain

- Associated soil types
  - complex of rock outcrops, very stony and very shallow soils ((Lithic) Leptosol) (1)
  - moderately deep, red-brownish, loamy soils with a good natural fertility (Chromic Luvisol) (20)
  - shallow, stony loam soils (Eutric Regosol and Cambisol) (21)
- Inclusions
  - shallow, very stony, silt loamy to loamy soils (Skeletic Cambisol, Leptic Cambisol, Skeletic Regosol) (4)
  - clays of floodplains with very high watertable with moderate to good natural fertility (Eutric Gleysol, Gleyic Cambisol) (33)

=== Negash geosyncline ===
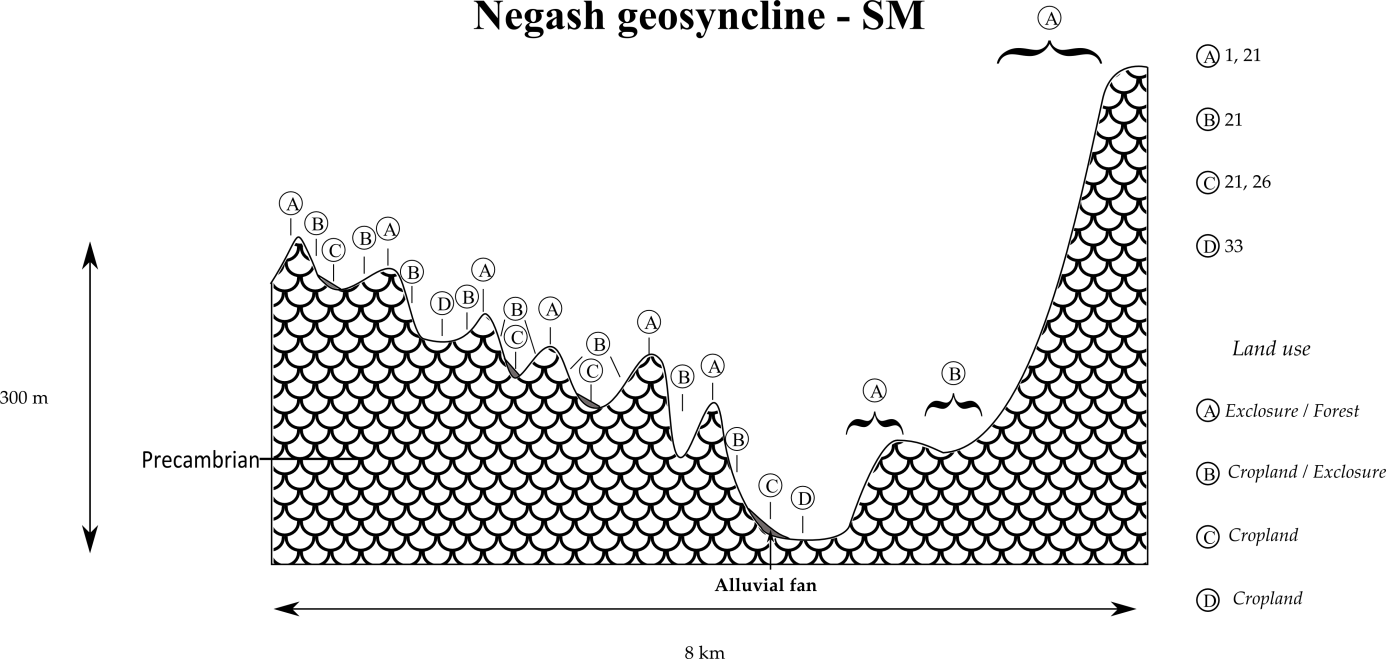
Typical catena in the Negash geosyncline

- Dominant soil type: shallow, stony loam soils (Eutric Regosol and Cambisol) (21)
- Associated soil types
  - complex of rock outcrops, very stony and very shallow soils ((Lithic) Leptosol) (1)
- Inclusions
  - moderately deep, brown loamy soils ((Eutric) Luvisol) (26)
  - clays of floodplains with very high watertable with moderate to good natural fertility (Eutric Gleysol, Gleyic Cambisol) (33)

== Soil erosion and conservation ==
The reduced soil protection by vegetation cover, combined with steep slopes and erosive rainfall has led to excessive soil erosion. Nutrients and organic matter were lost and soil depth was reduced. Hence, soil erosion is an important problem, which results in low crop yields and biomass production. As a response to the strong degradation and thanks to the hard labour of many people in the villages, soil conservation has been carried out on a large scale since the 1980s and especially 1980s; this has curbed rates of soil loss. Measures include the construction of infiltration trenches, stone bunds, check dams, small reservoirs such as Addi Abagiè, as well as a major biological measure: exclosures in order to allow forest regeneration. On the other hand, it remains difficult to convince farmers to carry out measures within the farmland (in situ soil management), such as bed and furrows or zero grazing, as there is a fear for loss of income from the land. Such techniques are however very effective.
