= Alisol =

An Alisol is a Reference Soil Group of the World Reference Base for Soil Resources (WRB).

Alisols have an argic horizon, which has a high cation exchange capacity. In the subsoil, the base saturation is low.

There exist mixed forms, for example 'Stagnic Alisol', that are mainly Alisol, but also contain components that are found in Stagnosols.

Alisols occur in tropical and humid subtropical climates, but are also found in temperate regions. Compared to Lixisols, Acrisols and Ferralsols, Alisols have much higher-activity clays and are likely to be found on younger terrains or more geologically active regions such as Kyushu and Chugoku.

== Agricultural use ==
Alisols are acidic (increased by limited drainage) and therefore need liming, contain few nutrients and therefore need fertilizer, and do not have much surface coherence so are easily eroded.

Aluminium and manganese toxicity is a very serious problem in Alisols, because at the low pH of these soils such generally insoluble metals become soluble and can poison plants which are not tolerant of them. Encyclopædia Britannica mentions oil palm, cotton, and maize (corn) as crops suitable to be grown on Alisols, though most crops require very intensive fertilisation for long-term success.
