= Xırmandalı =

Xırmandalı or Charmandaly or Kharmandali or Kharmandaly or Khyrmandaly may refer to:

- Xırmandalı, Bilasuvar, Azerbaijan
- Xırmandalı, Masally, Azerbaijan
