= Gizgayit Hasanova =

Gizgayit Hasanova Qızqayıt Həsənova
- Born: 1924; Khyrmandaly, Salyan Uyezd, Azerbaijan SSR, TSFSR, USSR
- Died: August 22, 2012 (aged 87–88); Khyrmandaly, Bilasuvar District, Azerbaijan
- Education: K. Timiryazev Moscow Agricultural Academy
- Occupation: cotton grower
- Political party: CPSU
- Awards: Hero of Socialist Labour

Gizgayit Salman gizi Hasanova (Azerbaijani: Qızqayıt Salman qızı Həsənova, 1924 – August 22, 2012) was an Azerbaijani cotton grower, Hero of Socialist Labor.

== Biography ==
Gizgayit Hasanova was born in 1924 in Khyrmandaly village of Bilasuvar District. She began her career as an ordinary collective farmer. From 1953 to 1996 she worked as the chairman of the collective farm named after Telman in Khyrmandaly village.

Gizgayit Hasanova graduated from the K. Timiryazev Moscow Agricultural Academy in 1975. In 1984, the Telman collective farm was named after Gizgayit Hasanova.

Gizgayit Hasanova was elected a deputy of the Supreme Soviet of the USSR of the V-VI convocation, the Supreme Soviet of the Azerbaijan SSR 9 times, II-X convocations, a member of the Central Committee of the Azerbaijan Communist Party, the Presidium of the Supreme Soviet of the Azerbaijan SSR, a member of the Bilasuvar district committee.

Hasanova died in 2012.

== Awards ==
- Hero of Socialist Labour — March 10, 1948
- Order of Lenin — March 10, 1948; April 8, 1971; December 12, 1973; March 10, 1982
- Order of the October Revolution — December 27, 1976
- Order of the Red Banner of Labour — April 30, 1966
- Order of Friendship of Peoples
- Medal "For Labour Valour" — March 7, 1960
- Jubilee Medal "In Commemoration of the 100th Anniversary of the Birth of Vladimir Ilyich Lenin"
