= Entisol =

Type of soil

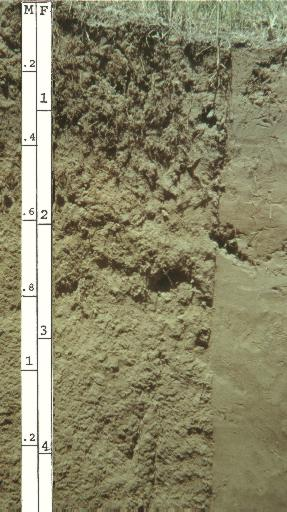
- Entisol profile showing little or no evidence of pedogenic horizon development
- Used in: USDA soil taxonomy

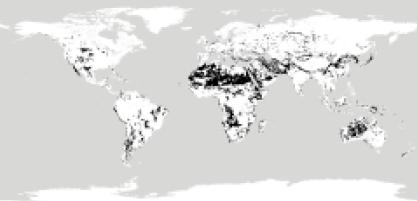
Entisols of the world

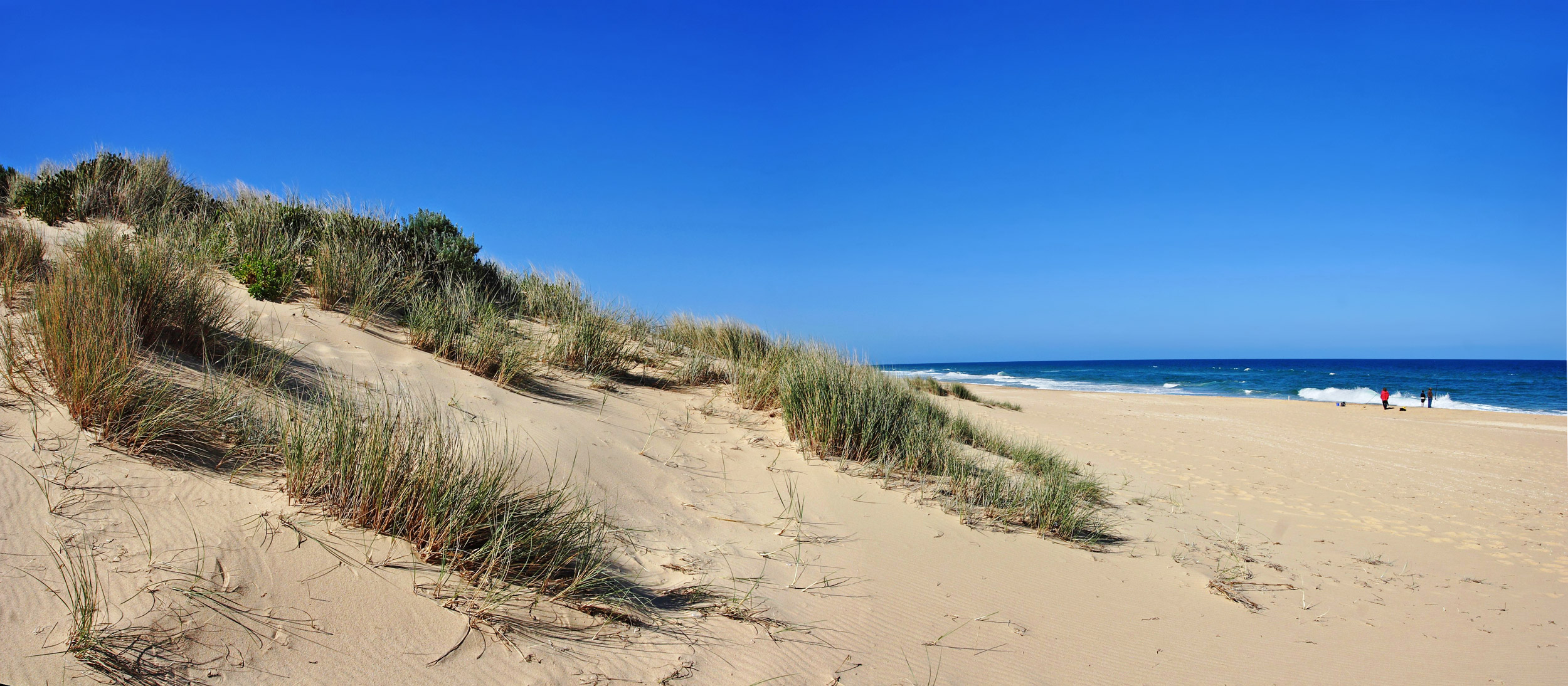
Entisols of stabilized sand dunes often fall into the Psamment soil suborder.

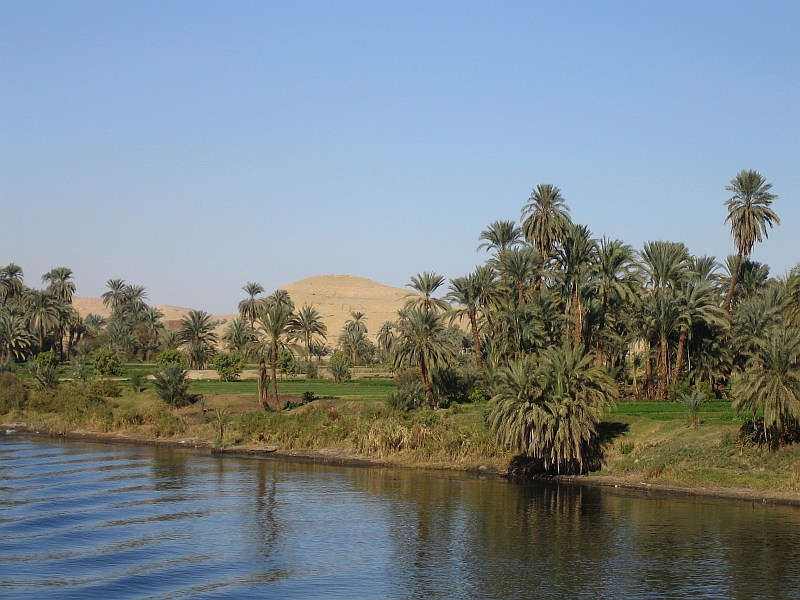
Much of the fertile agricultural soils of the Nile valley in Egypt are Entisols developed on alluvial materials (soil suborders Fluvent and Aquent)

Entisols are soils, as defined under USDA soil taxonomy, that do not show any profile development other than an A-horizon (or “A” horizon). Entisols have no diagnostic horizons, and are unaltered from their parent material, which could be unconsolidated sediment, or rock. Entisols are the most common soils, occupying about 16% of the global ice-free land area.

Because of the diversity of their properties, suborders of entisols form individual Reference Soil Groups in the World Reference Base for Soil Resources (WRB): psamments correlate with arenosols, and fluvents with fluvisols. Many orthents belong to regosols or leptosols. Most wassents and aquic subgroups of other suborders belong to the gleysols.

In Australia, most entisols are known as rudosols or tenosols.

== Causes of delayed or absent development ==
- Unweatherable parent materials – sand, iron oxide, aluminium oxide, kaolinite clay.
- Erosion – common on shoulder slopes; other kinds also important.
- Deposition – continuous, repeated deposition of new parent materials by flood as diluvium, aeolian processes which means by wind, slope processes as colluvium, mudflows, other means.
- Flooding or saturation.
- Cold climate – must not be sufficiently cold in winter for permafrost.
- Dry climate.
- Shallow to bedrock – may be rock resistant to weathering, such as quartzite or ironstone.
- Toxic parent materials – serpentine soil, mine spoils, sulfidic clays.

== Suborders ==
- Aquents – heavily saturated or soaked soils, mostly present at riparian locations (such as river banks, tidal mudflats, estuaries, etc). Here, consistent saturation limits development.
- Fluvents – alluvial soils, where development is prevented by repeated deposition of sediment during periodic flooding events; present in valleys or river deltas, especially those with high sediment load.
- Orthents – shallow or "skeletal" soils; found at sites of recent erosion events, or very old landforms completely devoid of weatherable minerals.
- Psamments – Entisols that are sandy (through all layers), and in which development is precluded by the impossibility of weathering the sand; formed from shifting or glacial sand dunes.
- Wassents – Entisols that have a positive water potential at the soil surface for more than 21 hours of each day, in all years.

== Paleopedology ==
Most fossil soils, before the development of terrestrial vegetation in the Silurian, are entisols that show no distinct soil horizons. Entisols are common in the paleopedological record ever since the Silurian; however, unlike other soil orders (oxisol, ultisol, gelisol, etc) they do not have value as indicators of climate. Orthents may sometimes indicate an extremely ancient landscape with minimal soil formation (i.e., Australia today).

== See also ==
- Illuvium
- Pedogenesis
- Pedology (soil study)
- Soil classification
