= Podzol =

Typical soils of coniferous or boreal forests

- Podsol, Podosol, Spodosol, Espodossolo
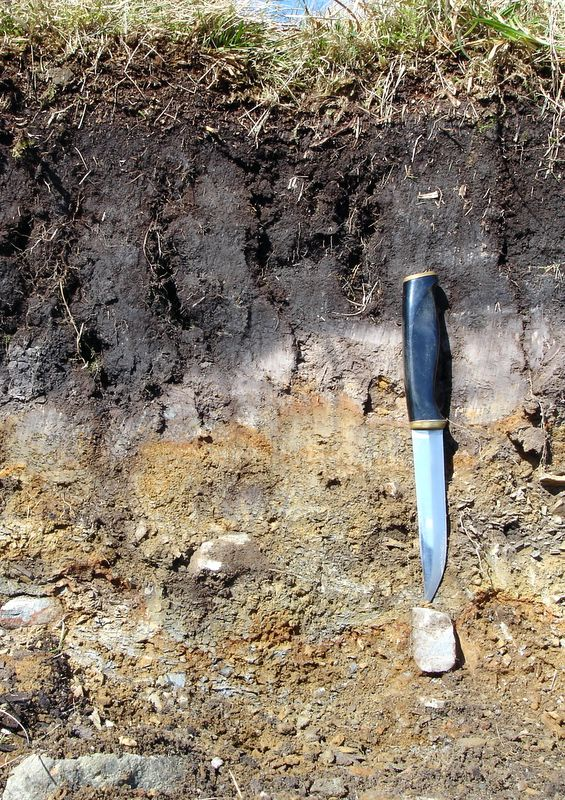
- The picture is of a stagnic podzol in upland Wales, and shows the typical sequence of organic topsoil with leached grey-white subsoil with iron-rich horizon below. This example has two weak ironpans.
- Used in: WRB, USDA soil taxonomy, others
- WRB code: PZ
- Profile: O(Ah)EBhsC
- Key process: podzolization
- Parent material: quartz rich debris and sediment
- Climate: humid continental, subarctic, oceanic, equatorial

H: common O: always, has humified organic matter mixed with minerals A: absent in most boreal podzols E: common, is ashen grey and leached in Fe and Al B: always, receives Fe and Al through illuviation C: common

Podzols, also known as podosols, spodosols, or espodossolos, are the typical soils of coniferous or boreal forests and also the typical soils of eucalypt forests and heathlands in southern Australia. In Western Europe, podzols develop on heathland, which is often a construct of human interference through grazing and burning. In some British moorlands with podzolic soils, cambisols are preserved under Bronze Age barrows.

== Term ==
Podzol means "under-ash" and is derived from the Russian под (pod) + зола́ (zola); the full form is подзо́листая по́чва (podzolistaya pochva), meaning "under-ashed soil". The term was first given in mid-1875 by Vasily Dokuchaev, and over time adopted by soil science. It refers to the common experience of Russian peasants of plowing up an apparent under-layer of ash (leached or E horizon) during first plowing of a virgin soil of that type.

== Characteristics ==
Podzols can occur on almost any parent material but generally derive from either quartz-rich sands and sandstone or sedimentary debris from magmatic rocks, provided there is high precipitation. Most Podzols are poor soils for agriculture due to the sandy portion, resulting in a low level of moisture and nutrients. Some are sandy and excessively drained. Others have shallow rooting zones and poor drainage due to subsoil cementation. A low pH further compounds issues, along with phosphate deficiencies and aluminum toxicity. The best agricultural use of Podzols is for grazing, although well-drained loamy types can be very productive for crops if lime and fertilizer are used.

The E horizon (or Ae in Canadian soil classification system), which is usually 4 to 8 centimetres (1.6 to 3.1 in) thick, is low in Fe and Al oxides and humus. It is formed under moist, cool and acidic conditions, especially where the parent material, such as granite or sandstone, is rich in quartz. It is found under a layer of organic material in the process of decomposition, which is usually 5 to 10 centimetres (2.0 to 3.9 in) thick. In the middle, there is often a thin horizon of 0.5 to 1 centimetre (0.2 to 0.4 in). The bleached soil horizon, which always has a higher value than the horizons above and below it, goes over into a red or red-brown horizon (so-called Podzolic B). The colour is strongest in the upper part, and change at a depth of 50 to 100 centimetres (20 to 40 in) progressively to the part of the soil that is mainly not affected by processes; that is the parent material. The soil profiles are designated by the letters A (topsoil), E (eluviated soil), B (subsoil) and C (parent material).

In some Podzols, the E horizon is absent—either masked by biological activity or obliterated by disturbance. Podzols with little or no E horizon development are often classified as brown Podzolic soils, also called Umbrisols or Umbrepts.

== Geographic distribution ==
Distribution of Podzol soils according to the World Reference Base for Soil Resources classification: Dominant (more than 50% of soil cover) Codominant (25–50%) Associated (5–25%)

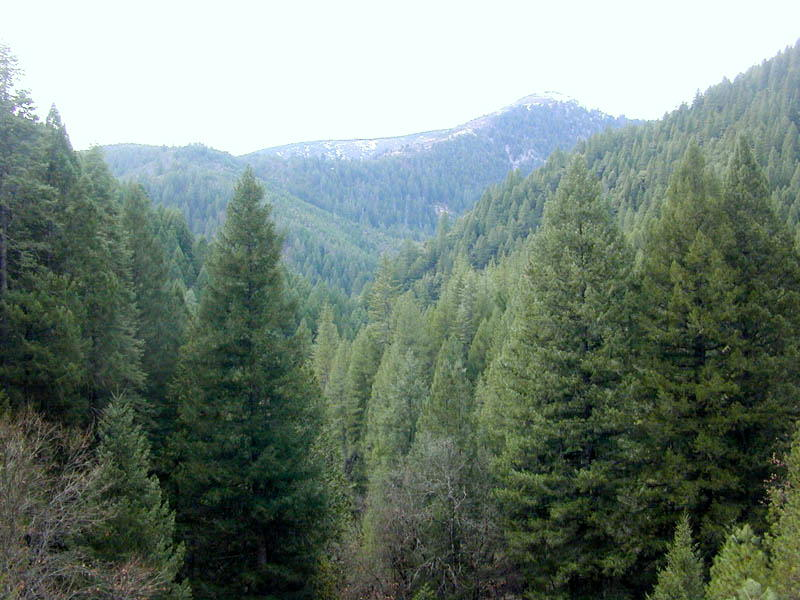
The biome typically associated with Spodosols is coniferous forest.

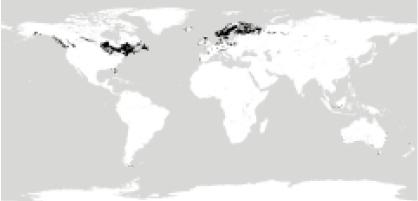
Spodosols of the world

Podzols cover about 4,850,000 square kilometres (1,870,000 mi^{2}) worldwide and are usually found under sclerophyllous woody vegetation. By extent Podzols are most common in temperate and boreal zones of the Northern Hemisphere but they can also be found in other settings including both temperate rainforests and tropical areas.

In South America Podzols occur beneath Nothofagus betuloides forests in Tierra del Fuego.

== Podzolization ==
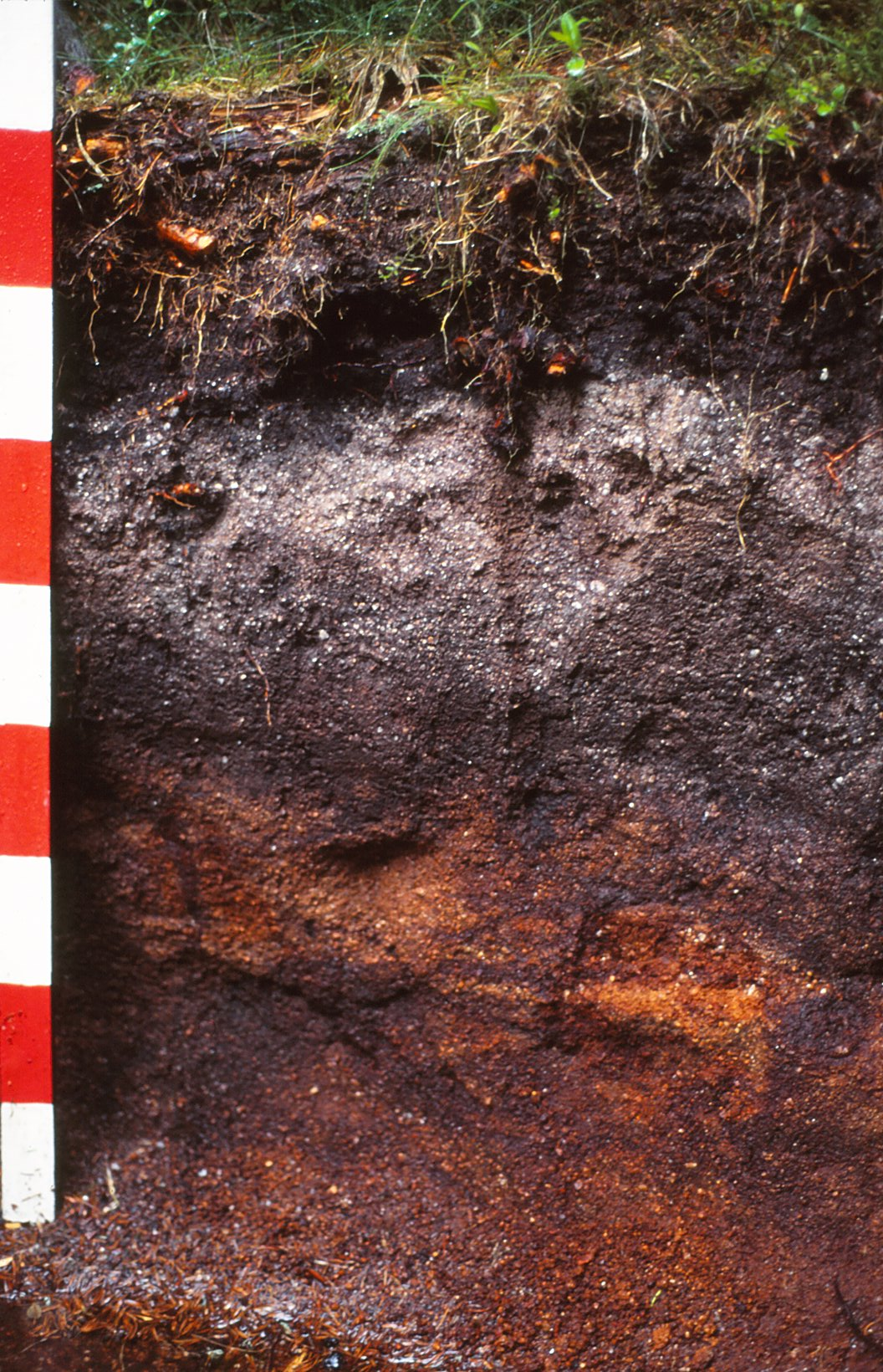
A Podzol with a characteristic eluvial (bleached, ash-colored) horizon and intensely coloured illuvial horizons. The photo was taken in the Feldberg area, Southern Black Forest, Germany.

Podzolization (or Podsolization) is a complex soil formation process by which dissolved organic matter and ions of iron and aluminium, released through weathering of various minerals, form organo-mineral complexes (chelates) and are moved from the upper parts of the soil profile and deposit in the deeper parts of soil. Through this process, the eluvial horizon becomes bleached and of ash-grey colour. The complexes move with percolating water further down to illuviated horizons which are commonly coloured brown, red or black as they accumulate and consist of cemented sesquioxides and/or organic compounds. The podzolization is a typical soil formation process in Podzols.

=== Preconditions ===
Podzolization usually occurs under forest or heath vegetation and is common in cool and humid climates as these climates inhibit the activity of soil microbes in the topsoil. Overall, podzolization happens where the decomposition of organic matter is inhibited and as a result, acidic organic surface (mor) layers build up. Under these typically acidic conditions, nutrient deficiency further hampers the microbial degradation of organic complexing agents. Medium to coarse textured soils with base-poor parent material (usually rich in quartz) also promote podzolization, as they encourage percolating water flow.

=== Key steps ===
The soil-forming process of podzolization can be broken down into two main steps:

1. Mobilization and translocation of organic matter, Fe and Al from the surface horizon, and
2. Immobilization and stabilization of organic matter, Fe and Al into the subsoil.
  Podzol A layers

In the topsoil of acidic soils, organic matter (mostly from plant litter, the humus layer and root exudates) together with Al- and Fe-ions, form organo-mineral complexes. These soluble chelates then relocate with percolating water from the A (or E horizon) to the B horizon. As a result of this, the E horizon (or Ae horizon in the Canadian system of soil classification) is left bleached and ash-grey in colour, while the B horizon becomes enriched with relocated organo-mineral complexes. The colour of B horizon is consequently red, brown or black, depending on the dominance of metal ions or organic matter. Usually, the boundary between the B and eluvial Ae (or E) horizon is very distinct, and sometimes a hardpan (or Ortstein) can form, as the relocated Fe and Al and organic matter increase mineral particles, cementing them into this compacted layer.

There are several reasons why these organo-mineral complexes immobilize in the B horizon: If during the eluviation process more Al- or Fe-ions bind to the organic compounds, the complex can flocculate as the solubility of it decreases with increasing metal to carbon ratio. Apart from that, a higher pH (or higher Ca content) in the lower soil horizons can result in the breakdown of metal-humus complexes. In the lower soil layers, the organic complexing agents can be degraded by functioning microorganisms. Already established complexes in the B horizon can act as a filter, as they adsorb the traveling complexes from the upper soil horizons. A decreased water conductivity due to higher clay content can also result in the early flocculation of organo-mineral complexes.

The relocated substances can sometimes separate in the illuvial horizons. Then, organic substances are mostly enriched in the uppermost part of the illuvial horizon, whereas Fe- and Al-oxides are mostly found in the lower parts of the illuvial horizon.

Podzolization also promotes the relocation of some nutrients (Cu, Fe, Mn, Mo and P) that sometimes brings them closer to plant roots.

== In different soil classification systems ==
The definitions in different soil classification systems are quite different. Especially soils that show pronounced other soil-forming processes in addition to podzolization are handled in different ways. The following correlations refer to soils, which have undergone advanced podzolization but lack prominent other soil-forming processes.

The term Podzols is used in the World Reference Base for Soil Resources (WRB) and in many national soil classification systems (in some of them, spelled Podsols).

- The USDA soil taxonomy and the Chinese soil taxonomy call these soils Spodosols.
- The Canadian system of soil classification matches Podzols with soils under the Podzolic order (e.g. Humo-Ferric Podzol).
- The Australian Soil Classification uses the term Podosols.
- The Brazilian Soil Classification System calls them Espodossolos.

== See also ==
- Soil type
