= Durisol =

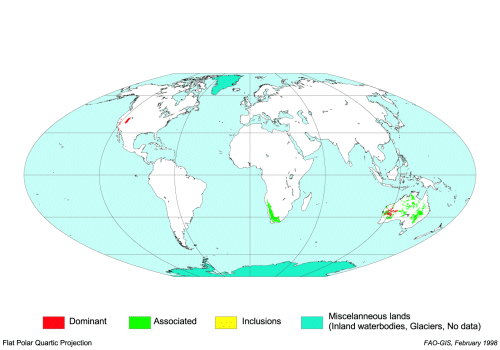
Distribution of Durisols

A Durisol is a Reference Soil Group under the World Reference Base for Soil Resources (WRB) referring to free-draining soils in arid and semi-arid environments that contain grains cemented together by secondary silica (SiO_{2}) in the upper metre of soil, occurring either as concretions (durinodes – duric horizon) or as a continuously cemented layer (duripan – hardpan (Australia) – dorbank (South Africa) – petroduric horizon). The name is derived from Latin durus for hard.

In the FAO/Unesco Soil Map of the World, the Durisols with petroduric horizon were indicated as duripan phase of other soils, e.g. of Xerosols and Yermosols.

Durisols are developed mainly in alluvial and colluvial deposits of all texture classes. They are found on level and slightly sloping alluvial plains, terraces and gently sloping piedmont plains in arid, semi-arid and Mediterranean regions.

The soils have AC or ABC profile. Eroded Durisols with exposed hard horizons (a petroduric horizon) are common in (gently) sloping terrain.

Most Durisols can only be used for extensive grazing. Arable cropping of Durisols is limited to areas where irrigation water is available.

Extensive areas of Durisols occur in Australia, in South Africa, Namibia and in the United States (notably in Nevada, California and Arizona); minor occurrences have been reported from Central and South America and from Kuwait. Durisols are a new introduction in international soil classification and have not often been mapped as such. A precise indication of their extent is not (yet) available.

== See also ==
- Pedogenesis
- Pedology (soil study)
- Soil classification
