= Rudi Dudal =

Raoul "Rudi" Dudal (1 May 1926 – 23 January 2014) was a Belgian soil scientist.

He was born in Brugge. He graduated in agricultural engineering in 1949 and took a PhD in agricultural sciences in 1955, both at the Catholic University of Leuven. From 1955 to 1984 he worked in the FAO, among others as the chief of soil resources development and conservation service from 1970 to 1975 and director of the Land and Water Development Division from 1976 to 1984. He was also among the main developers of the Soil Map of the World.

Within the International Soil Science Society, Dudal chaired the Commission on Soil Classification and Survey from 1968 to 1974, then served as secretary-general from 1974 to 1978.

From 1984 he was a professor of soil science at KU Leuven. Building on the earlier work with the Soil Map of the World, Dudal was also engaged in crafting World Reference Base for Soil Resources as secretary of the International Reference Base for Soil Classification from 1986 through 1992.

He received honorary degrees at the Ghent University (1976), the Cranfield University (1979) and the University of Aberdeen (1981). He was a member of the Royal Academy for Overseas Sciences from 1979, and was a corresponding or honorary member of the German Soil Science Society (1980), the Soil Conservation Society of America (1981), the Association française pour l'étude du sol (1982) and the Soil Science Society of America (1985). He was inducted into the Norwegian Academy of Science and Letters in 1989. In 2010 he received the Guy Smith Medal.

He died in January 2014 in Borchtlombeek.
