= Xırmandalı, Masally =

Azerbaijani village

Khirmandaly
- Municipality
- Location within Azerbaijan
- Coordinates: 39°09′43″N 48°43′03″E
- Country: Azerbaijan
- Rayon: Masally

Population
  - Total: 3,745
  - Density: 221/km^{2} (570/sq mi)
- Time zone: UTC+4 (AZT)
  - Summer (DST): UTC+5 (AZT)

Khirmandaly (Azerbaijani: Xırmandalı) is a village and municipality in the Masally Rayon of Azerbaijan. It has a population of 3,745. The area is mildly densely populated, with 221 people per square kilometre. The nearest town larger than 50,000 inhabitants is about an hour away by local transportation.

== History ==
The village Khirmandaly was named after a family in the Bayat tribe. The name of the settlement is also related to the name of the Turkic-speaking Khirmandaly tribe. The eponymous peoples, whose name was recorded variously as Harmandalu, Kharmandalu, Kharbandalu, and Khudabandalu, are mentioned to be important to the political life of the Safavid state. During the period of Fath Ali Khan of Quba (1758–1789), a part of Khirmandaly people moved from Ardabil province of South Azerbaijan to the Mushkur and Shabran districts of Quba Khanate. Mandili oikonym in the Fuzuli region is also a distorted form of the name Khirmandaly.

Oruj bey Bayat described Khirmandalis as "like marquises" in his book Relaciones de Don Juan de Persia.

== Geography ==
The average elevation in Khirmandaly is −5 metres (−16 ft) below sea level. The village is in a very strong (vii) earthquake zone, with earthquakes measuring from strong (6) to major (7) on the Richter scale. There is a medium-high occurrence of extreme drought, while the flooding risk is low. The land area is cultivated and mostly covered with croplands and vegetation. The soil is high in calcisols, cambisols, and luvisols, all of which are soils high in calcium carbonate.

Khirmandaly has distinct seasons, with cold winters and warm summers. August is the warmest month, with an average temperature of 30.9 °C (87.6 °F) at mid-day. On average, July has the most sunshine. January is the coldest, with an average temperature of 0 °C (32 °F) at night. Winter has prolonged freezing periods. Rainfall and other precipitation has no distinct peak month. The climate is humid (> 0.65 p/pet) and classified as Mediterranean (mild with a dry, hot summer) with a warm temperate dry forest biozone.
