= Gypsisol =

Soil type with significant gypsum

Gypsisols in the World Reference Base for Soil Resources (WRB) are soils with substantial secondary accumulation of gypsum (CaSO_{4}.2H_{2}O). They are found in the driest parts of the arid climate zone. In the USDA soil taxonomy they are classified as Gypsids (USDA Soil Taxonomy), in the Russian soil classification they are called Desert soils (USSR).

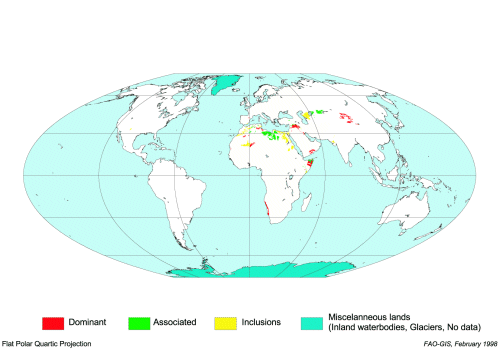
Distribution of Gypsisols

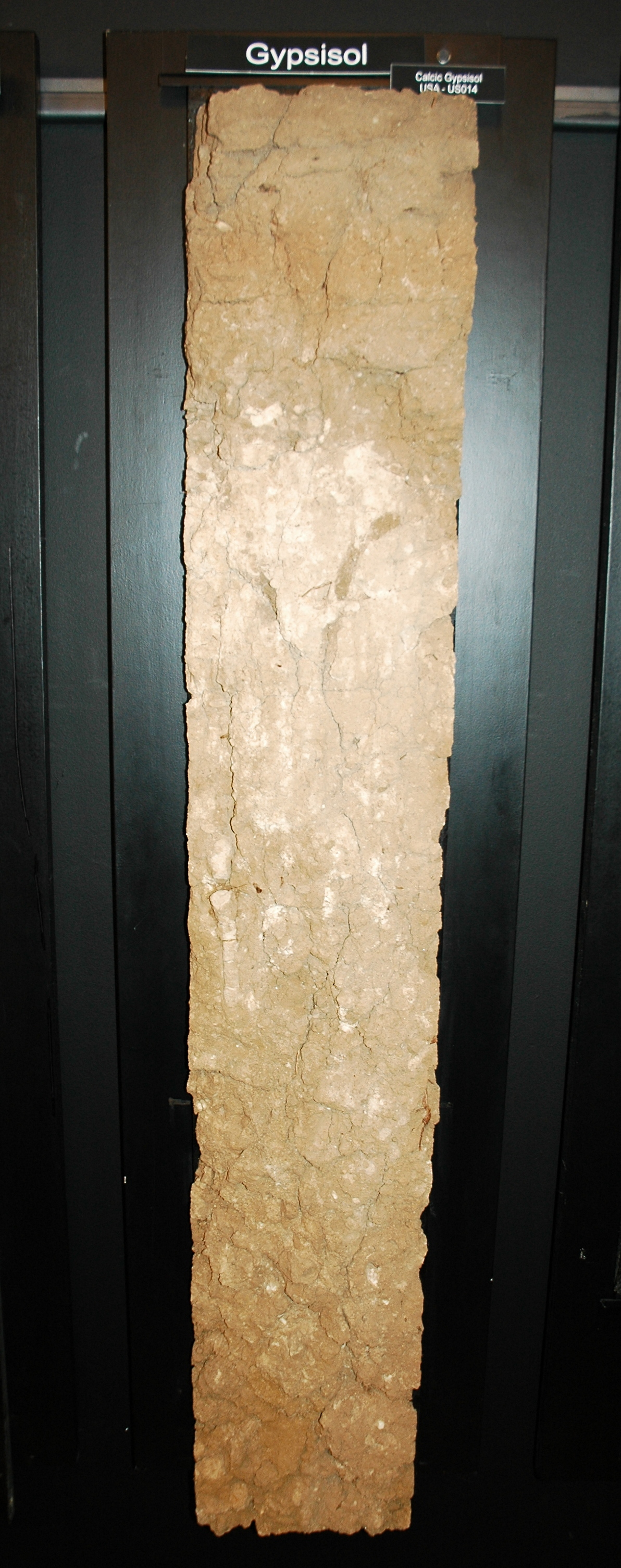
Calcic Gypsisol found in the US

Gypsisols are developed in mostly unconsolidated alluvial, colluvial and aeolian deposits of base-rich weathering material. They are found on level to hilly land in arid regions. The natural vegetation is sparse and dominated by xerophytic shrubs and trees and/or ephemeral grasses

These soils have ABC profiles. Accumulation of calcium sulphate, with or without carbonates, is concentrated in and below the B horizon.

Deep Gypsisols located close to water resources can be planted to a wide range of crops. Yields are severely depressed where a petrogypsic horizon occurs at shallow depth. Nutrient imbalance, stoniness, and uneven subsidence of the land surface upon dissolution of gypsum in percolating (irrigation) water are further limitations. Irrigation canals must be lined to prevent the canal walls from caving in. Large areas of Gypsisols are in use for low volume grazing.

Gypsisols are exclusive to arid regions; their worldwide extent is probably of the order of 100 million hectares. Major occurrences are in and around Mesopotamia in desert areas in the Middle East and adjacent central Asian republics, in the Libyan and Namib deserts, in southeast and central Australia and in the southwestern United States.

== See also ==
- Pedogenesis
- Pedology (soil study)
- Soil classification
