= Psamment =

Soil type

In USDA soil taxonomy, a Psamment is defined as an Entisol which consists basically of unconsolidated sand deposits, often found in shifting sand dunes but also in areas of very coarse-textured parent material subject to millions of years of weathering. This latter case is characteristic of the Guiana Highlands of northern South America. A Psamment has no distinct soil horizons, and must consist entirely of material of loamy sand or coarser in texture. In the World Reference Base for Soil Resources (WRB), most Psamments belong to the Arenosols. However, Psamments of fluviatile, lacustrine or marine origin belong to the Fluvisols.

Psamments cover 3.4% of the global land mass. They occur throughout the world, being especially abundant in the deserts of Africa and Australia and on the ancient landforms of eastern South America. Areas dominated by Psamments also occur in other humid regions, notably in Florida and Nebraska (the Sand Hills).

Psamments typically have very low water-holding capacities because the sand in the soil is not graded so that sands of varying coarseness are constantly mixed right through the soil. Because most sands are highly siliceous, Psamments are also extremely low in all essential nutrients, most especially phosphorus and are highly acidic in all except very arid climates. Psamments formed as a result of glacial erosion (common in northern Europe) are typically of rather higher native fertility because of their youth, but are still much less fertile than most soils in the regions they are located in.

The vegetation on Psamments varies enormously owing to the variety of climates, but in many cases is remarkably well-adapted to the climate, as with the Fynbos of the Cape region in South Africa—famous for its remarkable biodiversity and the equally species-rich Kwongan of southwestern Western Australia. The campinas and kerangas are healthy forests typical of Psamments in South America and Borneo.

Few Psamments are farmed, and where they are, the cost is high because of the expense of fertilization. They are always much less productive than other soils in the same region even when fertilized, and require careful management because the sand is very easily eroded.

In USDA soil taxonomy, Psamments are divided into:

- Cryopsamments: Psamments that have a cryic soil temperature regime
- Quartzipsamments: other Psamments that have, in the 0.02 to 2.0 mm fraction within the particle-size control section, a total of more than 90 percent (by weighted average) resistant minerals
- Torripsamments: other Psamments that have an aridic (or torric) moisture regime
- Ustipsamments: other Psamments that have an ustic moisture regime
- Xeropsamments: other Psamments that have a xeric moisture regime
- Udipsamments: other Psamments.

== See also ==
- Pedogenesis
- Pedology (soil study)
- Psammosere
- Soil classification
- Soil types
