= International Soil Reference and Information Centre =

Science-based foundation

ISRIC, also known as the International Soil Reference and Information Centre, is an independent science-based foundation that provides quality-assessed soil information and knowledge to address pressing global environmental and societal challenges. It was established in 1966, following a recommendation by the International Society of Soil Science (ISSS, now known as the International Union of Soil Sciences (IUSS)) and the United Nations Educational, Scientific and Cultural Organization (UNESCO). ISRIC's mission is to increase the availability and use of quality-assessed soil data, information and knowledge to: (i) contribute to a better understanding of the Earth system, and (ii) support informed decision-making for sustainable land management worldwide.

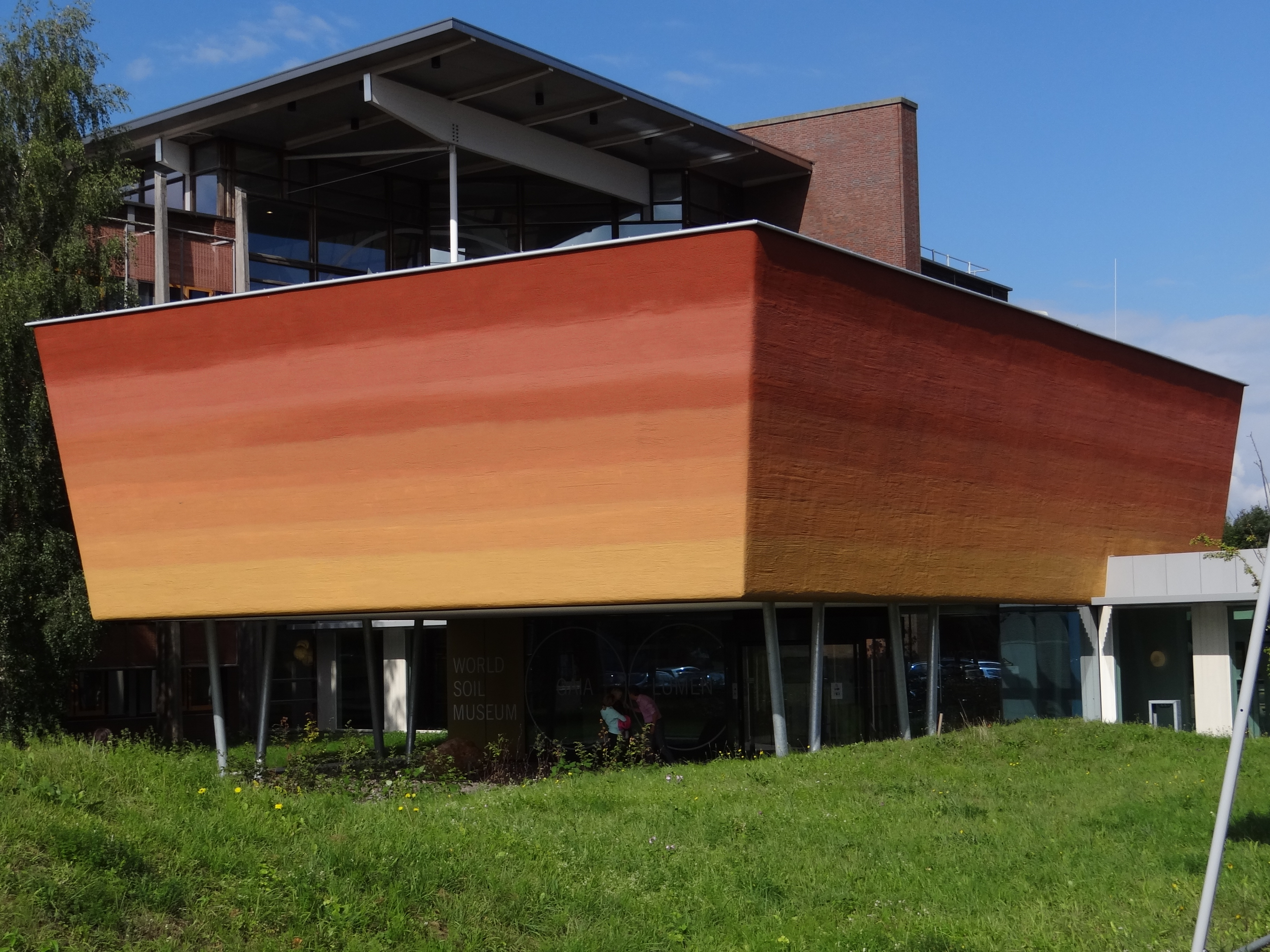
Building of the ISRIC World Soil Museum, Wageningen campus, Netherlands.

ISRIC's work and expertise is focused in four main areas:

1. Soil collections and education
2. Development of standards for soil information
3. Development of harmonised global and continental soil information products
4. Strengthening Soil Information Systems on national, regional, and continental level
5. Information products and services to assist decision making for sustainable land management

Since 1989, ISRIC has been accredited as the World Data Centre for Soils (WDC-Soils) by the World Data System (WDS) of the International Science Council (ISC). ISRIC is home to the World Soil Museum and the World Soil Reference Collection.

ISRIC's flagship soil information products include the World Soil Information Service (WoSIS) and SoilGrids.

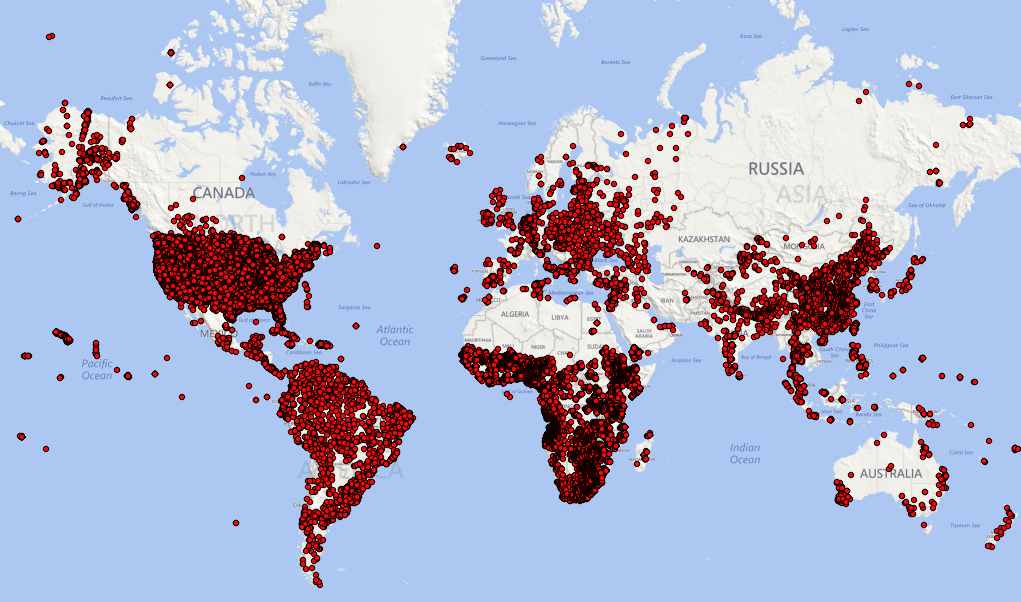
Location of soil profiles served from WOSIS
