= World Reference Base for Soil Resources =

International soil classification system

The World Reference Base for Soil Resources (WRB) is an international soil classification system for naming soils and creating legends for soil maps. The currently valid version is the fourth edition 2022. It is edited by a working group of the International Union of Soil Sciences (IUSS).

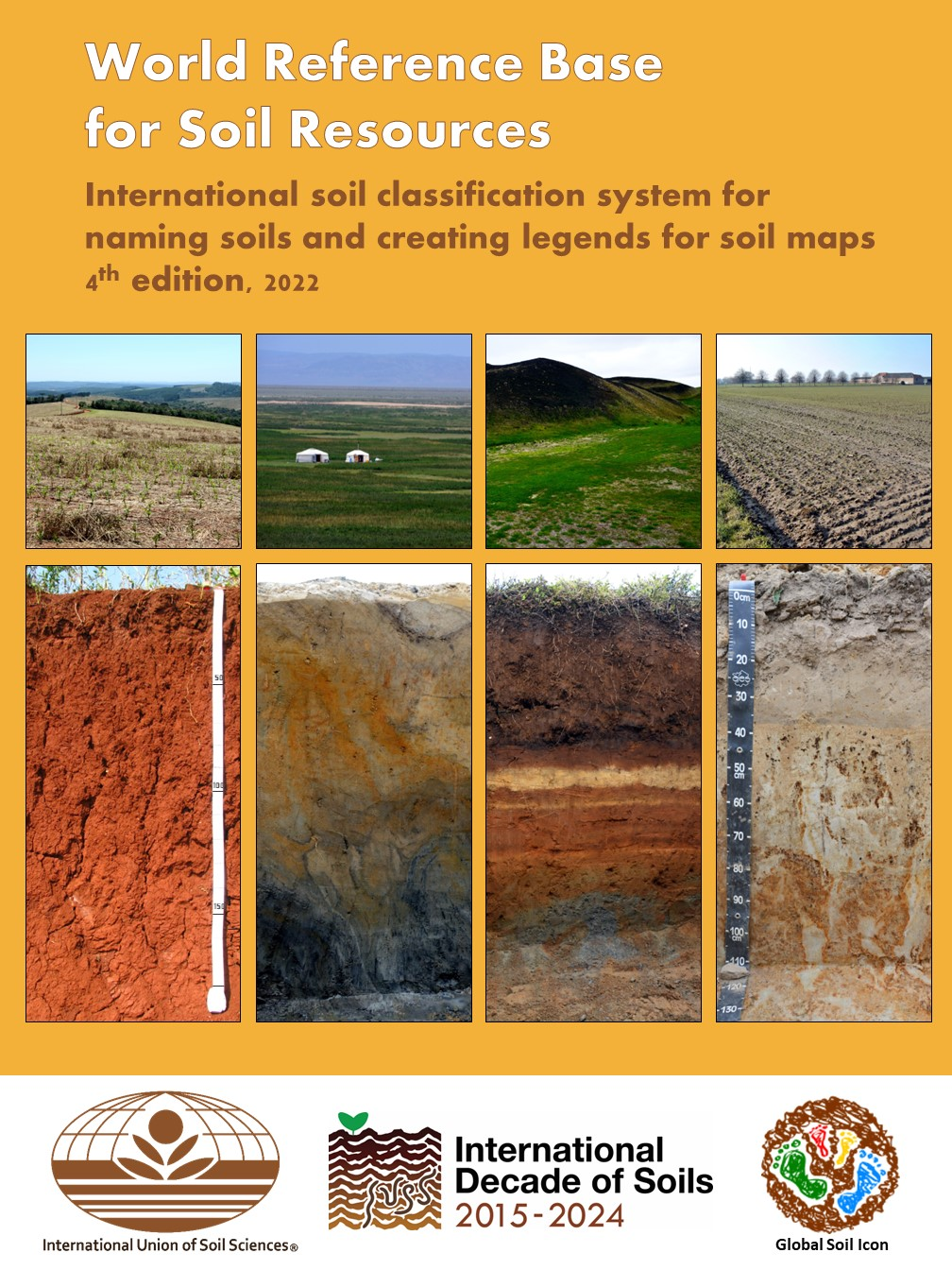
WRB, 4th edition (2022)

== Background ==
=== History ===
Since the 19th century, several countries developed national soil classification systems. During the 20th century, the need for an international soil classification system became more and more obvious.

From 1971 to 1981, the Food and Agriculture Organization (FAO) and UNESCO published the Soil Map of the World, 10 volumes, scale 1 : 5 M). The Legend for this map, published in 1974 under the leadership of Rudi Dudal, became the FAO soil classification. Many ideas from national soil classification systems were brought together in this worldwide-applicable system, among them the idea of diagnostic horizons as established in the '7th approximation to the USDA soil taxonomy' from 1960. The next step was the Revised Legend of the Soil Map of the World, published in 1988.

In 1982, the International Soil Science Society (ISSS; now: International Union of Soil Sciences, IUSS) established a working group named the International Reference Base for Soil Classification (IRB). Chair of this working group was Ernst Schlichting. Its mandate was to develop an international soil classification system that should better consider soil-forming processes than the FAO soil classification. Drafts were presented in 1982 and 1990.

In 1992, the IRB working group decided to develop a new system named World Reference Base for Soil Resources (WRB) that should further develop the Revised Legend of the FAO soil classification and include some ideas of the more systematic IRB approach. Otto Spaargaren (International Soil Reference and Information Centre) and Freddy Nachtergaele (FAO) were nominated to prepare a draft. This draft was presented at the 15th World Congress of Soil Science in Acapulco in 1994. At the same congress, the WRB was established as an ISSS working group replacing the IRB. At the 16th World Congress of Soil Science in Montpellier in 1998, the first edition of the WRB was published. At the same congress, the ISSS endorsed the WRB as its correlation system for soil classification. (In 2014, the USDA soil taxonomy also received the status of a correlation system.) At the 18th World Congress of Soil Science in Philadelphia in 2006, the second edition of the WRB was presented, and at the 20th World Congress of Soil Science in Jeju in 2014, the third edition. An update of the third edition was issued in 2015. Whereas the second edition was only suitable for naming soils, the third and the following edition can additionally be used for creating map legends. At the 22nd World Congress of Soil Science in Glasgow in 2022, the fourth edition was published. The 4th edition is an open access document under the terms of the Creative Commons Attribution License, which permits use, distribution and reproduction in any medium, provided the original work is properly cited.

The WRB has two hierarchical levels (see below) and has in that sense a similar approach as the French référencial pédologique (1992, 1995, 2008). Contrary to that, the USDA soil taxonomy is strongly hierarchical and has six levels. The classification in WRB is based mainly on soil morphology (field and laboratory data) as an expression of pedogenesis. Another difference with USDA soil taxonomy is that soil climate is regarded only as a soil-forming factor and not as a soil characteristic. The WRB is not meant to replace national soil classification systems, which, for their area, may be more detailed than the WRB.

=== WRB Working Group ===
The WRB is edited by a working group of the International Union of Soil Sciences (IUSS). The current chair of the working group is Cezary Kabala (Wroclaw University of Environmental and Life Sciences, Poland, since 2022). The current vice-chair is Stephan Mantel (International Soil Reference and Information Centre (ISRIC), The Netherlands, since 2018).

Chairs of the WRB working group and responsible first authors of the WRB editions are: Seppe Deckers (Belgium, 1st edition 1998), Erika Michéli (Hungary, 2nd edition, 2006) and Peter Schad (Germany, 3rd edition, 2014 and 4th edition, 2022).

The WRB working group has a homepage that is currently hosted by the ISRIC. It provides the following:

- the currently valid fourth edition of the WRB (2022) for download,
- the third edition (Update 2015) with the English original and the translations into Czech, French, Georgian, Polish, Russian, Slovene, and Spanish,
- an explanation of the system,
- soil profile photos of all RSGs, which may be downloaded and used if the author is accredited (additional photos can be found on the World of Soils page of the IUSS),
- the history of the WRB,
- the WRB leadership,
- information about past and upcoming workshops,
- teaching material (including videos),
- invitations for publications,
- links to other institutions important for the WRB.

== The WRB 2022 ==
=== Architecture ===
The classification is based on diagnostic horizons, diagnostic properties and diagnostic materials, altogether called diagnostics:

- Diagnostic materials are materials that significantly influence soil-forming processes (pedogenesis) or are indicative of them. They may be inherited from the parent material or be the result of soil-forming processes.
- Diagnostic properties are typical results of soil-forming processes or reflect specific conditions of soil formation.
- Diagnostic horizons are typical results of soil-forming processes showing a minimum thickness and therefore a horizontal appearance, thus forming a recognizable layer in the soil. The diagnostics have names (e. g. argic horizon, stagnic properties, fluvic material).

For example, diagnostic materials related to the concentration of organic carbon:

- Mineral material < 20% soil organic carbon
- Organic material ≥ 20% soil organic carbon
- Soil organic carbon: organic carbon that does not meet the diagnostic criteria of artefacts.

The classification comprises two levels:

The first level has 32 Reference Soil Groups (RSGs).

At the second level, for further differentiation, a set of qualifiers is added to the name of the RSG. There are 202 qualifiers in total. For every RSG, there is a list of available qualifiers, which are subdivided into two types:

- Principal qualifiers are ranked and given in an order of importance. The ranking of the principal qualifiers reflects major subdivisions of the respective RSG or properties strongly influencing the soil’s functionality.
- Supplementary qualifiers describe additional characteristics and are not ranked.

Qualifiers may be principal for some RSGs and supplementary for others. The names of the RSGs and the qualifiers start with capital letters. They must be given in English and must not be translated into any other language in order to guarantee that a certain soil has the same name all over the world.

=== Naming a soil ===
A key is used for allocating a soil to a certain RSG. In a defined sequence, the key asks for the presence or absence of certain diagnostics in a certain depth range. In addition, the key asks for single characteristics, e. g., a certain clay content or a certain base saturation. The soil belongs to the first RSG, for which it fulfils the set of criteria.

The qualifiers available for use with a particular RSG are listed in the key, along with the RSG. Their number is from 40 to 79. All applying qualifiers must be added to the soil name. Qualifiers:

- The principal qualifiers are added before the name of the RSG. The sequence is from right to left, i. e., the uppermost qualifier in the list is placed closest to the name of the RSG. If no other principal qualifier applies, the Haplic qualifier is used.
- The supplementary qualifiers are added in brackets after the name of the RSG and are separated from each other by commas. The sequence is from left to right. Supplementary qualifiers related to the texture, if applicable, are the first in the list. If several ones apply, they are placed in the sequence from the top to the bottom of the soil profile. All other supplementary qualifiers follow them and are used in alphabetical order.

If two or more qualifiers in the list are separated by a slash (/), only one of them can be used. The slash signifies that these qualifiers are either mutually exclusive (e. g. Dystric and Eutric) or one of them is redundant with the redundant qualifier(s) listed after the slash(es). In the soil name, supplementary qualifiers are always placed in the order of the alphabet (exception: supplementary qualifiers related to the texture, see above), even if their position in the list differs from the alphabetical sequence due to the use of the slash. It is a general rule that qualifiers conveying redundant information are not used. Example: If a soil has the Calcaric qualifier (carbonates present) the Eutric qualifier (high base saturation) is not used.

Qualifiers may be combined with specifiers (e. g. Epi-, Proto-) to form subqualifiers (e. g. Epiarenic, Protocalcic). The depth-related specifiers referring to layers are of special importance, although their use is optional:

- Epi-: only between ≥0 and ≤50 cm,
- Endo-: only below ≥50 cm,
- Amphi-: starting between >0 and <50 and ending between >50 and <100 cm,
- Ano-: starting at 0 and ending between >50 and <100 cm,
- Kato-: starting between >0 and <50 and ending at ≥100 cm,
- Poly-:
  - diagnostic horizons: two or more diagnostic horizons are present at the depth required by the qualifier definition, interrupted by layers that do not fulfil the criteria of the respective diagnostic horizon;
  - other layers: two or more layers within 100 cm fulfil the criteria of the qualifier, interrupted by layers that do not fulfil the criteria of the respective qualifier,
- Panto-: from 0 to ≥100 cm.

=== Creating map legends with the WRB ===
The number of qualifiers used in a map legend depends on the scale. The WRB distinguishes three map scale levels:

- first map scale level: RSG only,
- second map scale level: the RSG plus the first applying principal qualifier,
- third map scale level: the RSG plus the first two applying principal qualifiers.

Correlating the map scale levels with concrete scales is difficult because selecting a map scale level depends very much from the homogeneity/heterogeneity of the landscape.

The principal qualifiers are added before the name of the RSG following the rules explained for naming a soil. Depending on the purpose of the map or according to national traditions, at any scale level, elective qualifiers may be added. They may be additional principal qualifiers from further down the list and not already used in the soil name, or they may be supplementary qualifiers. They are placed using the above-mentioned rules for supplementary qualifiers; principal qualifiers first, then supplementary qualifiers.

The WRB recommends that on a map unit not just one soil is indicated but an association of soils. For this purpose, WRB uses the following nomenclature:

- dominant: the soil represents ≥ 50% of the soil cover,
- codominant: the soil represents ≥ 25 to < 50% of the soil cover,
- associated: the soil represents ≥ 5 to < 25% of the soil cover.

Soils representing smaller areas are ignored in the denomination of the map unit.

For codominant and associated soils, it is allowed to use less principal qualifiers than would correspondent to the used map scale level. The use of specifiers is not recommended due to the generalization that is required when making maps. In map legends, the names of the RSGs are given in plural; in all other cases they are given in singular.

=== The WRB Manual ===
The WRB Manual comprises seven chapters and six annexes.

- Chapter 1 reports on background and basics. It includes tables of the diagnostics and of the RSGs. The latter is given below.
- Chapter 2 provides the rules for naming soils and creating map legends. It starts with the definition of some general terms in WRB, like ‘fine earth’ and ‘whole soil’. It is highly recommended to read this short chapter before using the WRB.
- Chapter 3 presents the diagnostic horizons, properties and materials, each with a general description, the diagnostic criteria and some additional information. For the decision, whether a diagnostic is present or absent in a soil, only the diagnostic criteria are relevant.
- Chapter 4 provides the key to the RSGs and for every RSG a list with the available principal and supplementary qualifiers.
- Chapter 5 gives the definitions of the qualifiers.
- Chapter 6 provides the codes for the RSGs, the qualifiers and the specifiers and the rules for the sequence of the codes for naming soils and creating map legends.
- Chapter 7 is the list of references.

The seven chapters are followed by six annexes:

- Annex 1 is a field guide. It provides all field characteristics (including their definitions) needed for WRB classification and some additional general field characteristics. The characteristics are explained with many figures, and a flow chart is offered for hand texturing.
- Annex 2 lists the laboratory methods. This is only a list; it is not a laboratory manual.
- Annex 3 presents horizon and layer symbols for soil description. The field guide and the horizon and layer symbols are newly added to the WRB Manual and are meant to replace the FAO Guidelines for Soil Description (2006) for the use with WRB.
- Annex 4 is a soil description sheet. It is a separate document in the form of an excel file to fill in the surveyed field characteristics.
- Annex 5 provides a guidance for database set-up (not yet published).
- Annex 6 suggests colours in maps showing the RSGs. These suggestions follow roughly the colour choices in the atlases edited by the Joint Research Centre of the European Commission.

== List of the Reference Soil Groups according to WRB 2022 ==
This is the list of the 32 Reference Soil Groups (RSGs) in the sequence of the key (Chapter 4 of the WRB Manual), including the codes (Chapter 6 of the WRB Manual). This list is mainly taken from Table 2 (Chapter 1) of the WRB Manual.

Soils with thick organic layers

- HS Histosol (with thick organic layers)

Soils with strong human influence

- AT Anthrosol (with long and intensive agricultural use, often altered to enhance fertility)
- TC Technosol (containing significant amounts of artefacts)

Soils with limitations to root growth

- CR Cryosol (permafrost-affected)
- LP Leptosol (thin or with many coarse fragments)
- SN Solonetz (with a clay-enriched subsoil with high concentrations of exchangeable Na)
- VR Vertisol (high contents of shrink-swell clays, alternating wet-dry conditions)
- SC Solonchak (high concentrations of soluble salts)

Soils distinguished by Fe/Al chemistry

- GL Gleysol (groundwater-dominated, underwater or in tidal areas)
- AN Andosol (with allophanes and/or complexes of Al and organic matter)
- PZ Podzol (subsoil accumulation of organic matter and/or oxides)
- PT Plinthosol (accumulation and redistribution of Fe)
- PL Planosol (stagnant water, abrupt textural difference)
- ST Stagnosol (stagnant water, no or only moderate textural difference)
- NT Nitisol (low-activity clays, P fixation, many Fe oxides, strongly structured)
- FR Ferralsol (dominance of kaolinite and oxides)

Pronounced accumulation of organic matter in the mineral topsoil

- CH Chernozem (very dark and well-structured topsoil, secondary carbonates)
- KS Kastanozem (dark topsoil, secondary carbonates)
- PH Phaeozem (dark topsoil, no secondary carbonates (unless very deep), high base status)
- UM Umbrisol (dark topsoil, low base status)

Accumulation of moderately soluble salts or non-saline substances

- DU Durisol (accumulation of, and cementation by, secondary silica)
- GY Gypsisol (accumulation of secondary gypsum)
- CL Calcisol (accumulation of secondary carbonates)

Soils with clay-enriched subsoil

- RT Retisol (interfingering of coarser-textured, lighter-coloured material into a finer-textured, stronger-coloured layer)
- AC Acrisol (low-activity clays, exchangeable Al > exchangeable base cations)
- LX Lixisol (low-activity clays, exchangeable base cations ≥ exchangeable Al)
- AL Alisol (high-activity clays, exchangeable Al > exchangeable base cations)
- LV Luvisol (high-activity clays, exchangeable base cations ≥ exchangeable Al)

Note: The exchangeable base cations are given in cmol_{c} kg^{−1}.

Soils with little or no profile differentiation

- CM Cambisol (moderately developed)
- FL Fluvisol (stratified fluviatile, marine or lacustrine sediments)
- AR Arenosol (very sandy)
- RG Regosol (no significant profile development)

== Examples ==
=== Example for naming a soil with the WRB ===
Our example soil has the following characteristics:

Field characteristics (described according to Annex 1 of the WRB Manual): A soil developed from loess shows a marked clay increase in around 60 cm depth and clay coatings in the clay-richer horizon. According to the landscape setting, we presume that high-activity clays dominate. In the field, a pH of 6 is measured in the subsoil. The lower part of the clay-poorer topsoil is light-coloured, and the upper part is darker. In the clay-richer horizon, we observe redoximorphic features; the oximorphic and the reductimorphic features sum up to 30% of the exposed area, the intensive colours found in the interiors of the aggregates. In spring, reducing conditions occur. The soil is ploughed regularly.

Laboratory characteristics: The laboratory analyses confirm the high cation exchange capacity per kg clay in the clay-richer horizon and the dominance of exchangeable base cations over exchangeable Al in the subsoil. In the topsoil, we find 20% clay, 10% sand, and 70% silt; in the subsoil, 35% clay, 8% sand, and 57% silt. Organic matter concentrations in the topsoil are intermediate.

The naming of the soil consists of four steps.

Question 1: Does the soil have diagnostic horizons, properties and materials?

The soil has the following diagnostics:

- argic horizon (clay-richer horizon)
- stagnic properties (in the clay-richer horizon)
- reducing conditions (in the clay-richer horizon)
- claric material (light colours in the lower part of the clay-poorer topsoil)
- albic horizon (the claric material is the result of a soil-forming process, here: downward migration of clay minerals and oxides)

Question 2: To which RSG does the soil belong?

We have to go through the key, RSG by RSG. This soil is not a Histosol, not an Anthrosol, not a Technosol, etc. Finally, we end up with the Luvisol. This is the first RSG in the key, the criteria of which our soil completely fulfills.

Question 3: Which qualifiers apply?

From the list of the principal qualifiers, Stagnic (stagnic properties and reducing conditions) and Albic (light colours resulting from a soil-forming process) apply. Stagnic is found further up in the list. Therefore, the soil has to be named until now Albic Stagnic Luvisol. From the list of the supplementary qualifiers, Siltic (silty from 0 to 60 cm), Loamic (loamy from 60 cm downwards), Aric (ploughed), Cutanic (clay coatings), Differentic (the clay migration led to a significant difference in clay content), Endic (the argic horizon starts below 50 cm) and Ochric (relatively small concentrations of organic carbon) apply. Bringing the supplementary qualifiers into the correct order (first the textural qualifiers from the top to the bottom of the soil profile, then all others in alphabetical order), the soil is an Albic Stagnic Luvisol (Siltic, Loamic, Aric, Cutanic, Differentic, Endic, Ochric).

Question 4: Which specifiers can be used to form subqualifiers?

The soil is Siltic from 0 to 60 cm and Loamic from 60 cm downwards. We can use the depth-related specifiers Ano- and Endo- to construct the subqualifiers Anosiltic and Endoloamic. The stagnic properties occur only in the subsoil and the albic horizon around 50 cm. This means that we can use the subqualifiers Endostagnic and Amphialbic. Using these specifiers does not change the position of the qualifiers in the soil name.

Now, the soil name is: Amphialbic Endostagnic Luvisol (Anosiltic, Endoloamic, Aric, Cutanic, Differentic Endic, Ochric).

Using the codes of Chapter 6 of the WRB Manual gives us the following short name: LV-stn.abm-sia.lon-ai.ct.ed.oh.

=== Example for creating map legends with the WRB ===
Let's say that our example soil Amphialbic Endostagnic Luvisol (Anosiltic, Endoloamic, Aric, Cutanic, Endic, Ochric) covers 60% of the area of a map unit. The other 40% are covered by a Eutric Endoluvic Amphialbic Stagnosol (Anosiltic, Endoloamic, Humic). The map unit will be named as follows:

First map scale level:

- dominant: Luvisols
- codominant: Stagnosols

Second map scale level:

- dominant: Stagnic Luvisols
- codominant: Albic Stagnosols

Third map scale level:

- dominant: Albic Stagnic Luvisols
- codominant: Luvic Albic Stagnosols

Remarks: Using depth-related specifiers is not recommended in map legends where generalization is required.

At every scale level, elective qualifiers may be added. If one wants to give, e.g., information about organic carbon, one can do that even at the first map scale level and write:

- dominant: Luvisols (Ochric)
- codominant: Stagnosols (Humic)

If somebody wants to give additional information on soil genesis, this can also be done on the first map scale level:

- dominant: Luvisols (Stagnic)
- codominant: Stagnosols (Luvic)

Both in combination would read, e.g., at the second map scale level:

- dominant: Stagnic Luvisols (Ochric)
- codominant: Albic Stagnosols (Luvic, Humic)

== See also ==
- pH
- Soil salinity
- Soil texture
