= Umbrisol =

- a Umbrisol profile
- Used in: WRB
- WRB code: UM
- Profile: A(B)C
- Parent material: Weathered silicic rock
- Climate: Oceanic, other

In soil classification, an Umbrisol is a soil with a dark topsoil and in which organic matter has accumulated within the mineral surface soil—in most cases with low base saturation—to the extent that it significantly affects the behaviour and utilization of the soil. Umbrisols are the counterpart of comparable soils with a high base saturation (Chernozems, Kastanozems and Phaeozems).

Umbrisols develop in weathering material of siliceous rock. They are found in mostly cool humid climates in mountainous regions with little or no moisture deficit, including tropical and subtropical mountains.

Many Umbrisols are under a natural or near-natural vegetation cover. Umbrisols occur above the actual tree line in the Andean, Himalayan and Central Asian mountain ranges; they are at lower altitudes in northern and western Europe where the former forest vegetation has been largely cleared, carry a vegetation of short grasses of low nutritional value. Coniferous forest predominates in Brazil (and in the United States). Umbrisols in tropical mountain areas in South Asia and Oceania are under montane evergreen forest. In the mountains of southern Mexico, the vegetation varies from tropical semi-deciduous forest to much cooler montane cloud forest.

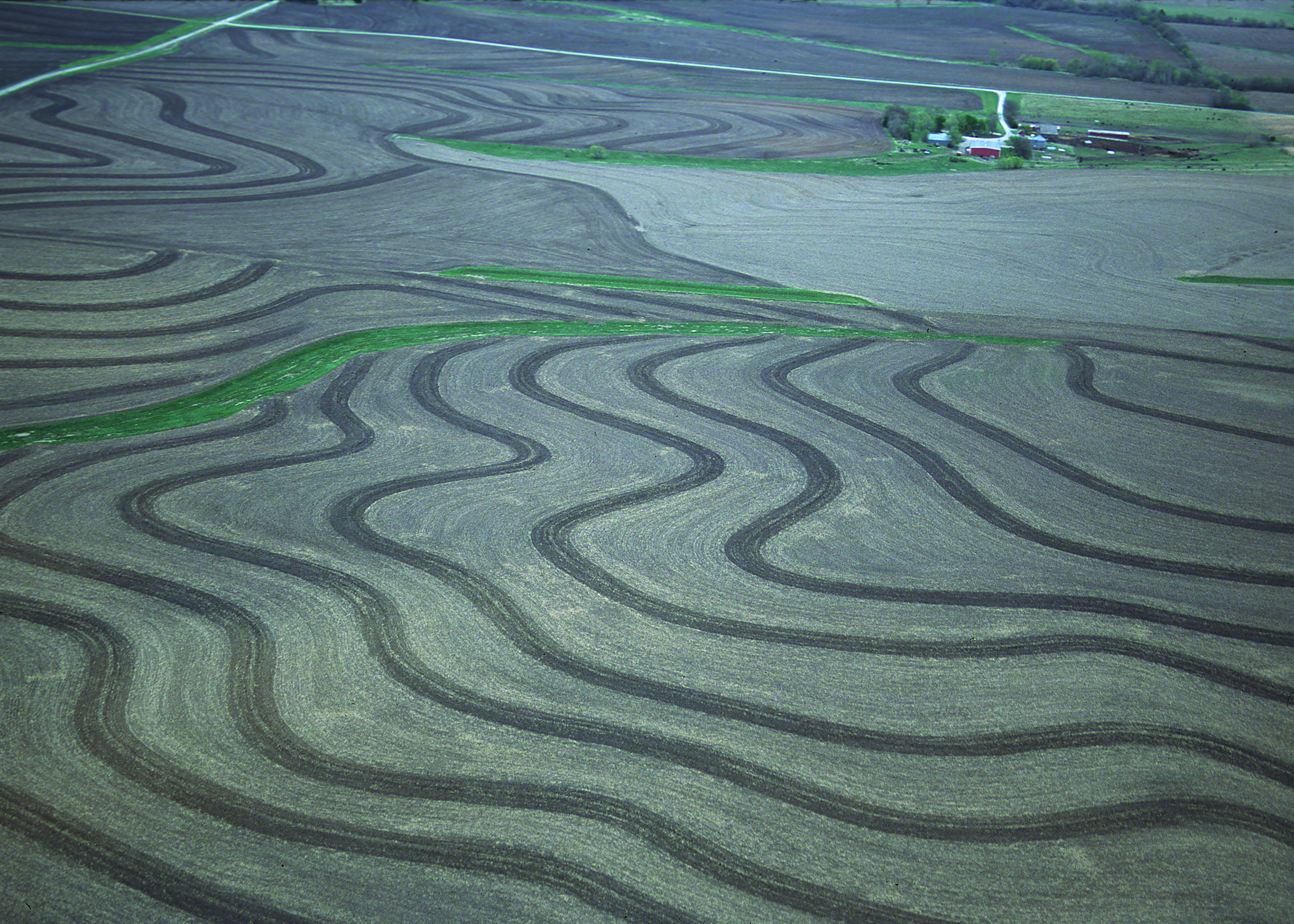
Contour terraces and grassed waterways used for erosion control in Kansas.

The predominance of sloping land and wet and cool climate conditions restricts utilization of many Umbrisols to extensive grazing. Management focuses on the introduction of improved grasses and correction of the soil pH by liming. Many Umbrisols are susceptible to erosion. The planting of perennial crops and bench or contour terracing offer possibilities for permanent agriculture on gentler slopes. Where conditions are suitable, cash crops may be grown, e.g. cereals and root crops in the US, Europe and South America, or tea and cinchona in Indonesia. Highland coffee on Umbrisols demands high management inputs to meet its stringent nutrient requirements. In New Zealand, Umbrisols have been transformed into highly productive soils, used for intensive sheep and dairy farming, and production of cash crops.

== Distribution ==
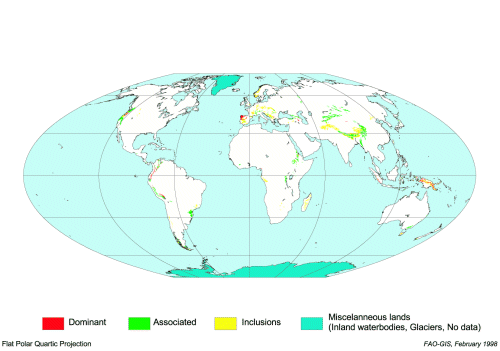
Distribution of umbrisols.

Umbrisols occupy about 100,000,000 hectares (250,000,000 acres) throughout the world. In South America, Umbrisols are common in the Andean ranges of Colombia, Ecuador, Venezuela, Bolivia and Peru. They also occur in Brazil, in Lesotho and in South Africa. Umbrisols in North America are confined largely to the northwest Pacific seaboard. In Europe, Umbrisols occur along the northwest Atlantic seaboard, e.g. in Iceland, on the British Isles and in northwest Portugal and Spain. In Asia, they are found in the mountain ranges east and west of Lake Baikal, and on fringes of the Himalayas, notably in India, Nepal, China and Burma. Umbrisols occur at lower altitudes in eastern India, in Burma and in Sumatra. In Oceania, Umbrisols are found in the mountain ranges of Papua New Guinea and southeast Australia and in the eastern parts of South Island, New Zealand.

== Related terminology ==
"Umbrisol" is a Reference Soil Group of the World Reference Base for Soil Resources (WRB).

Many of such soils are classified in the USDA soil taxonomy as Great Groups of Entisols and Inceptisols, and as "Very dark-humus soils" in the Russian soil classification.
