= Xırmandalı, Bilasuvar =

Xırmandalı
- Municipality
- Location within Azerbaijan
- Coordinates: 39°27′04″N 48°36′27″E
- Country: Azerbaijan
- Rayon: Bilasuvar

Population
  - Total: 7,824
- Time zone: UTC+4 (AZT)
  - Summer (DST): UTC+5 (AZT)

Xırmandalı (also, Charmandaly, Kharmandali, Kharmandaly, and Khyrmandaly) is a village and the most populous municipality, except for the capital Biləsuvar, in the Bilasuvar Rayon of Azerbaijan. It has a population of 7,824.
