= Luvisol =

Soil type

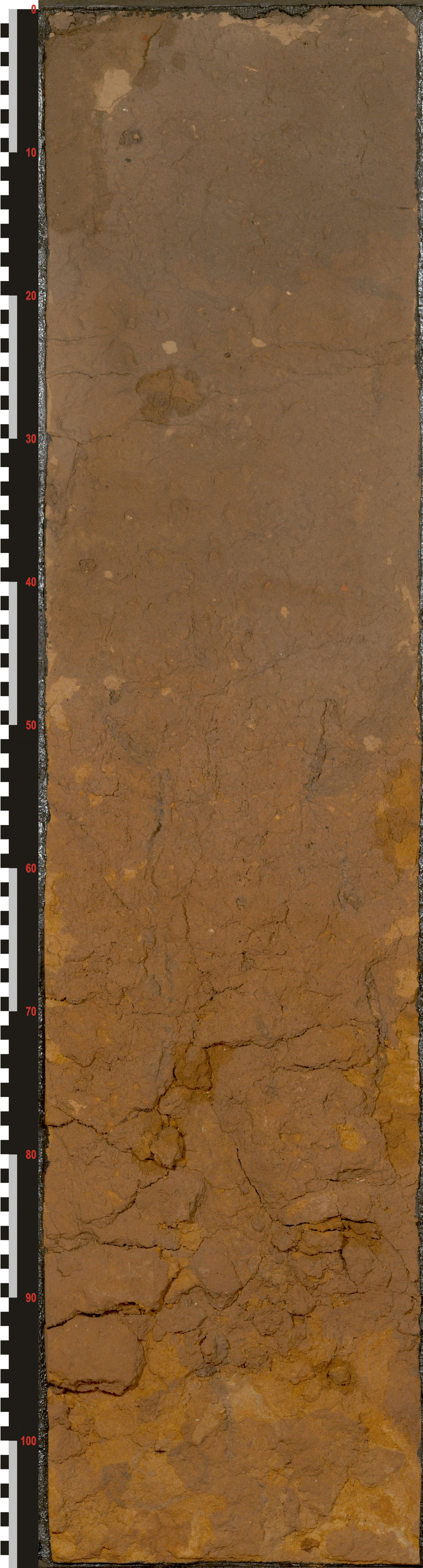
- Luvisol from the Netherlands
- Used in: WRB, other
- WRB code: LV
- Profile: AhEBtC
- Climate: Humid temperate climate

Luvisols are a group of soils, comprising one of the 32 Reference Soil Groups in the international system of soil classification, the World Reference Base for Soil Resources (WRB). They are widespread, especially in temperate climates, and are generally fertile. Luvisols are widely used for agriculture.

== Distribution ==
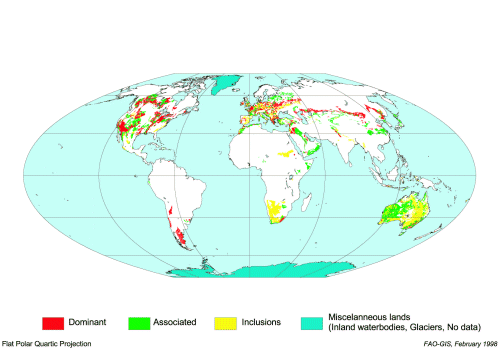
Global distribution

Luvisols cover 500–600 million ha of land area, mainly in the temperate zones. They form on a wide variety of mineral parent materials. In Mediterranean regions, the formation of hematite can produce red-coloured Chromic Luvisols.

== Description and formation ==
The main characteristic of Luvisols is an argic horizon, a subsurface zone with higher clay content than the material above it. This typically arises as clay is washed downward by water and accumulates at greater depth. The clay minerals have not been extensively weathered and are therefore of the high-activity, 2:1 type, giving these soils high cation exchange capacities and high base saturation. In uneroded landscapes, a lighter, clay-depleted eluvial horizon occurs above the argic horizon.

== In other classification systems ==
The Canadian system of soil classification includes Luvisols. In the USDA Soil Taxonomy, Luvisols are typically classified as Alfisols.
