= Lixisol =

Soil type

Lixisols are a Reference Soil Group of the World Reference Base for Soil Resources (WRB). They are soils with subsurface accumulation of low activity clays and high base saturation. They develop under intensive tropical weathering conditions and subhumid to semi-arid climate.

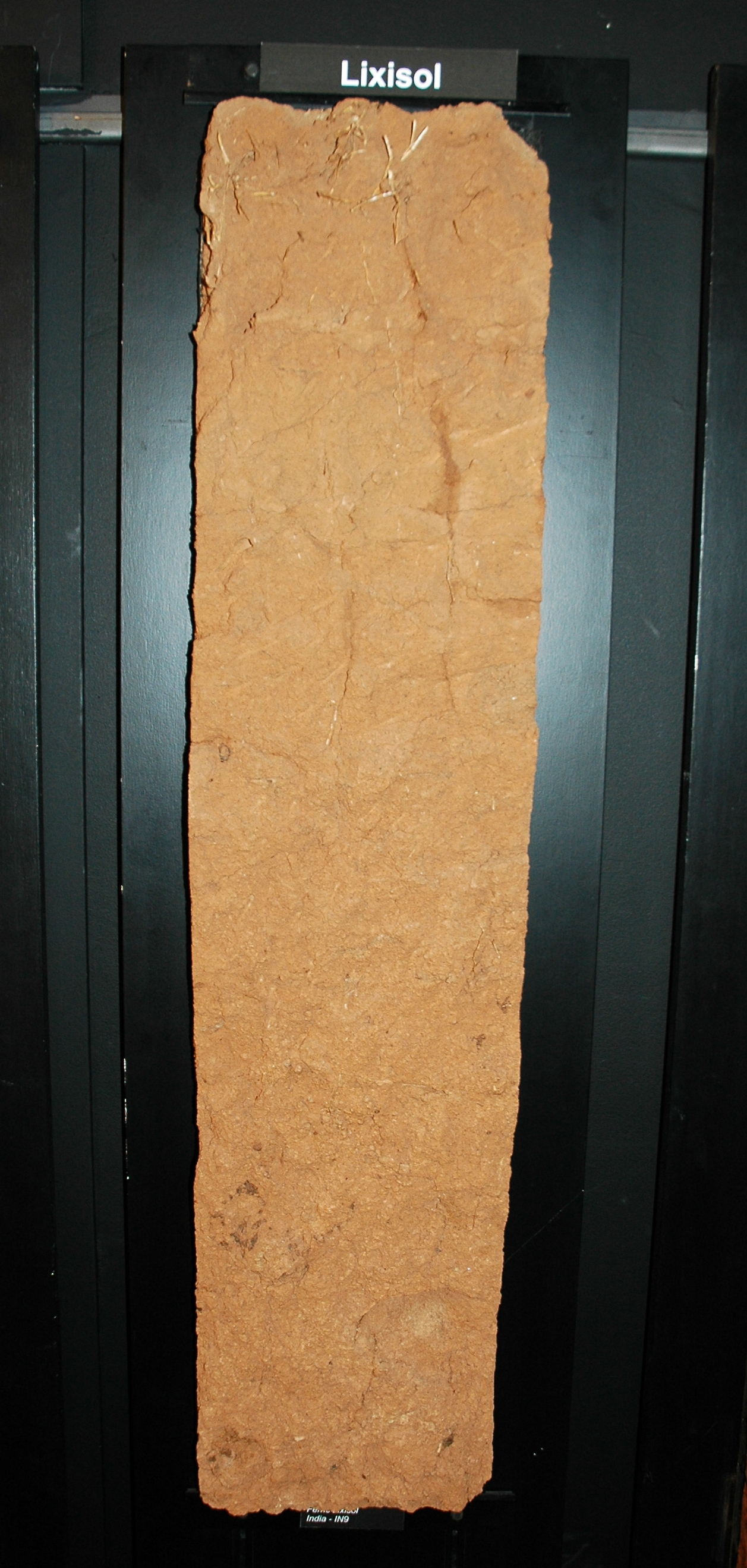
Soil profile of a Lixisol

== See also ==
- Soil type
