= Stagnosol =

Saturated soil type

A Stagnosol in the World Reference Base for Soil Resources (WRB) is soil with strong mottling of the soil profile due to redox processes caused by stagnating surface water.

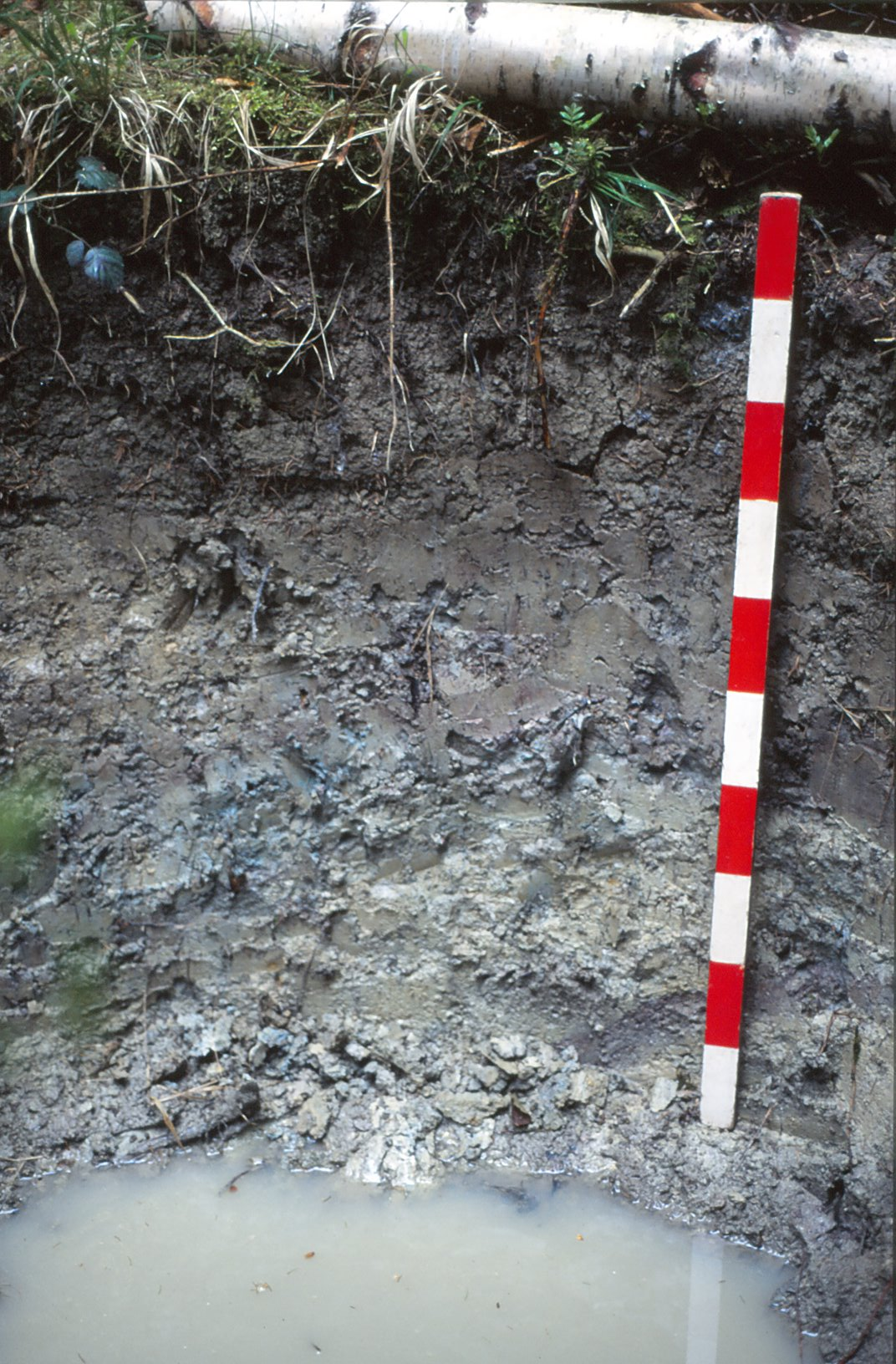
Stagnosol (Ah-Bg1-Bgc-Bg2) showing pooled water

Stagnosols are periodically wet and mottled in the topsoil and subsoil, with or without concretions and/or bleaching. The topsoil can also be completely bleached (albic horizon). A common name in many national classification systems for most Stagnosols is pseudogley. In the USDA soil taxonomy, many of them belong to the Aqualfs, Aquults, Aquents, Aquepts and Aquolls.

They are developed in a wide variety of unconsolidated materials like glacial till, and loamy aeolian, alluvial and colluvial deposits and physically weathered siltstone. Stagnosols occur on flat to gently sloping land in cool temperate to subtropical regions with humid to perhumid climate conditions.

The agricultural suitability of Stagnosols is limited because of their oxygen deficiency resulting from stagnating water above a dense subsoil. Therefore, they have to be drained. However, in contrast to Gleysols, drainage with channels or pipes is in many cases insufficient. It is necessary to have a higher porosity in the subsoil in order to improve the hydraulic conductivity. This may be achieved by deep loosening or deep ploughing. Drained Stagnosols can be fertile soils owing to their moderate degree of leaching.

Stagnosols cover 150–200 million ha worldwide. For the greater part in humid to perhumid temperate regions of West and Central Europe, North America, southeast Australia and Argentina. Here Stagnosols are associated with Luvisols as well as silty to clayey Cambisols and Umbrisols. They also occur in humid to perhumid subtropical regions, where they are associated with Acrisols and Planosols. with a light-coloured, coarse-textured, surface horizon that shows signs of periodic water stagnation and abruptly overlies a dense, slowly permeable subsoil with significantly more clay than the surface horizon. In the US Soil Classification of 1938 used the name Planosols, whereas its successor, the USDA soil taxonomy, includes most Planosols in the Great Groups Albaqualfs, Albaquults and Argialbolls.

== See also ==
- Pedogenesis
- Pedology (soil study)
- Soil classification
- Stagnogley
