= Acrisol =

Soil type

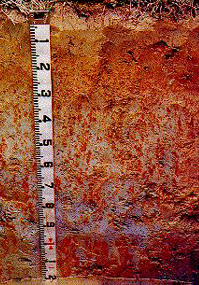
- A Stagnic Acrisol profile from Malaysia
- Used in: WRB
- WRB code: AC
- Profile: AEBtC
- Parent material: various
- Climate: tropical, humid subtropical

An Acrisol is a Reference Soil Group of the World Reference Base for Soil Resources (WRB). It has a clay-rich subsoil. It is associated with humid, tropical climates, such as those found in Brazil, and often supports forested areas. In the USDA soil taxonomy, Acrisols correspond to the Humult, Udult, and Ustult suborders of the Ultisols and also to Oxisols with a kandic horizon and to some Alfisols. Acrisol's low fertility and toxic amounts of aluminium pose limitations to its agricultural use, favouring in many places its use for silviculture, low-intensity pasture, and protected areas. Crops that can be successfully cultivated, if the climate allows, include tea, rubber tree, oil palm, coffee and sugar cane.

== See also ==
- Soil horizon
- Soil type
