= Cation-exchange capacity =

Measure of soil chemistry

Cation-exchange capacity (CEC) is a measure of how many cations can be retained on soil particle surfaces. Negative charges on the surfaces of soil particles bind positively-charged atoms or molecules (cations), but allow these to exchange with other positively charged particles in the surrounding soil water. This is one of the ways that solid materials in soil alter the chemistry of the soil. CEC affects many aspects of soil chemistry, and is used as a measure of soil fertility, as it indicates the capacity of the soil to retain several nutrients (e.g. K^{+}, NH_{4}^{+}, Ca^{2+}) in plant-available form. It also indicates the capacity to retain pollutant cations (e.g. Pb^{2+}).

== Definition and principles ==
Cation exchange at the surface of a soil particle

Cation-exchange capacity is defined as the amount of positive charge that can be exchanged per mass of soil, usually measured in cmol_{c}/kg. Some texts use the older, equivalent units me/100g or meq/100g. CEC is measured in moles of electric charge, so a cation-exchange capacity of 10 cmol_{c}/kg could hold 10 cmol of Na^{+} cations (with 1 unit of charge per cation) per kilogram of soil, but only 5 cmol Ca^{2+} (2 units of charge per cation). Cation-exchange capacity arises from various negative charges on soil particle surfaces, especially those of clay minerals and soil organic matter. Phyllosilicate clays consist of layered sheets of aluminium and silicon oxides. The replacement of aluminium or silicon atoms by other elements with lower charge (e.g. Al^{3+} replaced by Mg^{2+}) can give the clay structure a net negative charge. This charge does not involve deprotonation and is therefore pH-independent, and called permanent charge. In addition, the edges of these sheets expose many acidic hydroxyl groups that are deprotonated to leave negative charges at the pH levels in many soils. Organic matter also makes a very significant contribution to cation exchange, due to its large number of charged functional groups. CEC is typically higher near the soil surface, where organic matter content is highest, and declines with depth. The CEC of organic matter is highly pH-dependent.

Cations are adsorbed on soil surfaces by the electrostatic interaction between their positive charge and the negative charge of the surface, but they retain a shell of water molecules and do not form direct chemical bonds with the surface. Exchangeable cations thus form part of the diffuse layer above the charged surface. The binding is relatively weak, and a cation can easily be displaced from the surface by other cations from the surrounding solution.

== Soil pH ==
Effect of soil pH on cation-exchange capacity

The amount of negative charge from deprotonation of clay hydroxy groups or organic matter depends on the pH of the surrounding solution. Increasing the pH (i.e. decreasing the concentration of H^{+} cations) increases this variable charge, and therefore also increases the cation-exchange capacity.

== Measurement ==
Principle of CEC measurement in soil

Cation-exchange capacity is measured by displacing all the bound cations with a concentrated solution of another cation, and then measuring either the displaced cations or the amount of added cation that is retained. Barium (Ba^{2+}) and ammonium (NH_{4}^{+}) are frequently used as exchanger cations, although many other methods are available.

CEC measurements depend on pH, and therefore are often made with a buffer solution at a particular pH value. If this pH differs from the natural pH of the soil, the measurement will not reflect the true CEC under normal conditions. Such CEC measurements are called "potential CEC". Alternatively, measurement at the native soil pH is termed "effective CEC", which more closely reflects the real value, but can make direct comparison between soils more difficult.

== Typical values ==
The cation-exchange capacity of a soil is determined by its constituent materials, which can vary greatly in their individual CEC values. CEC is therefore dependent on parent materials from which the soil developed, and the conditions under which it developed. These factors are also important for determining soil pH, which has a major influence on CEC.

Typical ranges for CEC of soil materials

Average CEC (pH 7) for some US soils based on USDA Soil Taxonomy
Soil Taxonomy order	CEC (cmol_{c}/kg)
Ultisols	3.5
Alfisols	9
Spodosols	9.3
Entisols	11.6
Mollisols	18.7
Vertisols	35.6
Histosols	128

== Base saturation ==
Base saturation expresses the percentage of potential CEC occupied by the cations Ca^{2+}, Mg^{2+}, K^{+} or Na^{+}. These are traditionally termed "base cations" because they are non-acidic, although they are not bases in the usual chemical sense. Base saturation provides an index of soil weathering and reflects the availability of exchangeable cationic nutrients to plants.

== Anion-exchange capacity ==
Positive charges of soil minerals can retain anions using the same principle as cation exchange. The surfaces of kaolinite, allophane and iron and aluminium oxides often carry positive charges. In most soils the cation-exchange capacity is much greater than the anion-exchange capacity. Still, the opposite can occur in highly weathered soils, such as ferralsols (oxisols).

== General References ==
Ramos, F.T.; Dores E.F.G.C.; Weber O.L.S.; Beber D.C.; Campelo Jr J.H.; Maia J.C.S. (2018) "Soil organic matter doubles the cation exchange capacity of tropical soil under no-till farming in Brazil". J Sci Food Agric. 10.1002/jsfa.8881
