= FAO soil classification =

Supra-national soil classification

The Food and Agriculture Organization of the United Nations (FAO) developed a supra-national classification, which offers useful generalizations about pedogenesis in relation to the interactions between the main soil-forming factors. It was first published in form of the UNESCO Soil Map of the World (1974) (scale 1 : 5 M.). Many of the names offered in that classification are known in many countries and do have similar meanings.

Originally developed as a legend to the Soil Map of the World, the classification was applied by United Nations sponsored projects. Many countries modified this system to fit their particular needs.

The Soil Units (106) were mapped as Soil Associations, designated by the dominant soil unit:

- with soil phases (soil properties, such as saline, lithic, stony),
- with three textural classes (coarse, medium, and fine)
- three slopes classes superimposed (level to gently undulating, rolling to hilly, and steeply dissected to mountainous)

The 106 Soil Units form 26 Soil Groups. The FAO soil map was a very simple classification system with units very broad, but was the first truly international system, and most soils could be accommodated on the basis of their field descriptions. The FAO soil map was intended for mapping soils at a continental scale but not at local scale.

In 1988 the FAO published a Revised Legend with 153 Soil Units forming 28 Major Soil Groupings. It serves as basis for the Harmonized World Soil Database.

In 1998 this system was replaced by the World Reference Base for Soil Resources.

== Soil groups ==
=== FAO Soil Groups (Legend, 1974) ===
- Acrisols
- Andosols
- Arenosols
- Cambisols
- Chernozems
- Ferralsols
- Fluvisols
- Gleysols
- Greyzems
- Histosols
- Kastanozems
- Lithosols
- Luvisols
- Nitosols
- Phaeozems
- Planosols
- Podzols
- Podzoluvisols
- Rankers
- Regosols
- Rendzinas
- Solonchaks
- Solonetz
- Vertisols
- Xerosols
- Yermosols

=== FAO Major Soil Groupings (Revised Legend, 1988) ===
- Acrisols
- Alisols
- Andosols
- Anthrosols
- Arenosols
- Calcisols
- Cambisols
- Chernozems
- Ferralsols
- Fluvisols
- Gleysols
- Greyzems
- Gypsisols
- Histosols
- Kastanozems
- Leptosols
- Lixisols
- Luvisols
- Nitisols
- Phaeozems
- Planosols
- Plinthosols
- Podzols
- Podzoluvisols
- Regosols
- Solonchaks
- Solonetz
- Vertisols

== See also ==
- USDA soil taxonomy
- International Committee on Anthropogenic Soils (ICOMANTH)
- Soil types
- World Reference Base for Soil Resources
