= Polish Soil Classification =

The Polish Soil Classification (Polish: Systematyka gleb Polski) is a soil classification system used to describe, classify and organize the knowledge about soils in Poland.

== Overview ==
Presented below the 5th edition of Polish Soil Classification was published by Soil Science Society of Poland in 2011 and was in use to 2019 when 6th edition of Polish Soil Classification was published. Previous ones were published in 1956, 1959, 1974 and 1989, and they, following Dokuchaiev's ideas, were relied mostly on the natural's criteria (quality) like soil forming processes and soil morphological features (4th edition was transient because diagnostic soil horizons appeared there). 5th edition of classification, where it was possible, was built on quantitative criteria, like quantitative described diagnostic horizons, diagnostic materials and diagnostic properties. Soil forming processes are not a part of classification but the relationship between the processes and their morphological effects was taken into account during creating differentiating criteria of diagnostic horizons, materials and properties. The classification derives much of international systems: USDA soil taxonomy (1999) and World Reference Base for Soil Resources - WRB (2006).

Polish soil science intellectual tradition has always maintained a balance between genetical-geographic approach (typical for the Russian scientific school) and substantional-geological-petrographic approach (characteristic for Western Europe). Multilateral look at the soil manifested, in all editions of classification, that each soil was described by three types of characteristics:

- Genetical genesis described by type of soil – Polish: typ gleby based on diagnostic horizons, materials and properties,
- Geological origin of bedrock described by Polish: rodzaj gleby what might be literally translated as "kind" or "sort" of soil,
- Soil texture described of Polish: gatunek gleby what might be literally translated as "class" or "species" of soil.

The Polish Soil Classification has a hierarchical construction. Type of soil is a basic unit of the classification. They are distinguished on a basis of specific layout of main soil genetic or diagnostic horizons, similar chemical, physical and biological properties, type of humus, type of weathering and movement and deposition of results of that weathering. In principle, soil type is a result of main soil forming process. Types of soil are grouped into soil orders. They are identified based on the presence or absence of diagnostic horizons and properties reflecting the effect of specific groups of soil forming processes. Soil types are divided into subtypes.

== Genetical classification of soils (2011-2019) ==
- Order 1. Initial soils (Polish: Gleby inicjalne; WRB: Leptosols; ST: Entisols)

The order covers all soils where there is thick organic layer or humus horizon (< 10 cm) on solid rock (carbonate or not carbonate) or unconsolidated sediment (like sand, loam, loess). Initial soils can be found both in lowland areas and in mountains. Forming factor of soils from that order can be solid bedrock resistant to weathering, dynamic geomorphologic processes (like erosion) or fluvial accumulation.
- Type 1.1 "Rocky initial soils" (Note: Names of soil types are literally translated from Polish and can not be considered as an official. In other publications may be translated differently. Names of orders are cited by Polish Soil Classification.) (Polish: Gleby inicjalne skaliste; WRB: Lithic Leptosol, Nudilithic Leptosol, Lithic Leptosol (Calcaric); ST: Lithic Udorthents, Lithic Haplrendolls)
- Type 1.2 "Rubble initial soils" (Polish: Gleby inicjalne rumoszowe; WRB: Haplic Leptosol (Dystric), Leptic Regosol (Dystric), Haplic Leptosol (Calcaric); ST: Lithic Udorthents, Typic Udorthents, Lithic Udifolists)
- Type 1.3 "Erosional initial soils" (Polish: Gleby inicjalne erozyjne; WRB: Haplic Regosol; ST: Typic Udorthents)
- Type 1.4 "Accumulative initial soils" (Polish: Gleby inicjalne akumulacyjne; WRB: Haplic Fluvisol; ST: Typic Udifluvents)

- Order 2. Weakly developed soils (Polish: Gleby słabo ukształtowane; WRB: Leptosols, Regosols; ST: Entisols)

Soils from that order are the next development stage after initial soils. Humus horizon is deeper and under it are weekly developed genetic soil horizons which are not yet fulfilling all conditions of diagnostic horizons (like mollic, cambic, sideric, glossic etc.).
- Type 2.1 "Rankers" (Polish: Rankery; WRB: Haplic Regosol (Dystric) or (Dystic, Folic), (Note: "Haplic Regosol (Dystric) or (Dystic, Folic)" means "Haplic Regosol (Dystric) and Haplic Regosol (Dystic, Folic)"; "Haplic or Stagnic or Endogleyic or Vertic Cambisol" means "Haplic Cambisol, Stagnic Cambisol, Endogleyic Cambisol and Vertic Cambisol". This is a way to write it shorter.) Leptic Regosol (Skeletic); ST: Lithic or Typic Udorthents, Lithic Udifolists)
- Type 2.2 "Rendzinas" (Polish: Rędziny właściwe; WRB: Rendzic Leptosol, Folic Rendzic Leptosol, Haplic Leptosol (Calcaric), Folic Leptosol (Calcaric); ST: Lithic Udorthents, Typic Udorthents, Lithic Haplrendolls)
- Type 2.3 "Pararendzinas" (Polish: Pararędziny; WRB: Haplic Regosol (Calcaric); ST: Typie Udorthents, Typic Eutrudepts)
- Type 2.4 "Arenosols" (Polish: Arenosole; WRB: Haplic Arenosol; ST: Typic Udipsamments)
- Type 2.5 "Fluvisols" (Polish: Mady właściwe; WRB: Haplic Fluvisol; ST: Typic Udifhivents)
- Type 2.6 "Erosional weakly developed soils" (Polish: Gleby słabo ukształowane erozyjne; WRB: Haplic Regosol; ST: Typic Udorthents)

- Order 3. Brown forest soils (Brown earths, Polish: Gleby brunatnoziemne; WRB: Cambisols; ST: Inceptisols - Udepts)

This order includes all soils with cambic horizon, which is formed by weathering process without well seen eluviation. They have various genesis, parent material, properties and agricultural fertility.
- Type 3.1 "Eutrophic brown soils" (Polish: Gleby brunatne eutroficzne; WRB: Haplic Cambisol, Haplic or Stagnic or Endogleyic or Vertic Cambisol (Eutric); ST: Typic or Humic or Aquic or Oxyaquic or Vertic Eutrudepts)
- Type 3.2 "Dystrophic brown soils" (Polish: Gleby brunatne dystroficzne; WRB: Haplic or Stagnic Cambisol (Dystric), Endogleyic or Vertic Cambisol (Eutric); ST: Typic or Humic or Spodic or Aquic Dystrudepts, Oxyaquic or Vertic Eutrudepts)
- Type 3.3 "Brown fluvisols" (Polish: Mady brunatne; WRB: Fluvic Cambisol, Fluvic, Endogeyic Cambisol; ST: Fluventic or Oxyaquic Eutrudepts)
- Type 3.4 "Brown rendzinas" (Polish: Rędziny brunatne; WRB: Cambic Leptosol (Calcaric), Haplic Cambisol; ST: Rendollic Eutrudepts)

- Order 4. Rusty soils (Polish: Gleby rdzawoziemne; WRB: Arenosols; ST: Entisols - Psamments)

In this order are situated sandy soils with rusty sideric or rubic horison of weathering or iron accumulating. Morphologically they are similar to brown forest soil but soil forming process is slightly different, their parent material is always a sand and they are much less fertile.
- Type 4.1 "Rusty soils" (Polish: Gleby rdzawe; WRB: Brunic or Albie Brunic Arenosol (Dystric), Brunic Endogleyic Arenosol; ST: Typic or Spodic or Oxiaqic Udipsamments)
- Type 4.2 "Ochre soils" (Polish: Gleby ochrowe; WRB: Rubic Arenosol; ST: Typic Udipsamments)

- Order 5. Brown forest podzolic soils (Soil lessivé) (Polish: Gleby płowoziemne; WRB: Luvisols, Albeluvisols; ST: Alfisols - Aqualfs, Udalfs)

This order covers soils where clay leaching by snowmelt or rainy water leeds to develop eluvial horizon (luvic) from which clay has been leached and illuvial horizons (argic) in which clay has been deposited. Parent material may be from loamy sand to clay.
- Type 5.1 "Brown forest podzolic soils" (Polish: Gleby płowe; WRB: Albic or Haplic or Stanic or Gleyic or Lamelic or Vertic Luvisol; ST: Typic or Arenic or Aquic or Oxyaquic or Mollic or Psammentic or Lamelic or Glossic or Vertic Hapludalfs)
- Type 5.2 "Streak brown forest podzolic soils" (Polish: Gleby płowe zaciekowe; WRB: Haplic or Stagnic or Gleyic or Cambic Albeluvisol; ST: Typic or Arenic or Aquic or Oxyaquic or Haplic or Glossaqiuc or Vertic Glossudalfs)
- Type 5.3 "Wet brown forest podzolic soils" (Polish: Gleby płowe podmokłe; WRB: Gleyic Luvisol; ST: Typic or Umbric or Mollic Endoaqualfs, Typic Argialbolls)

- Order 6. Podzol soils (Polish: Gleby bielicoziemne; WRB: Podzols; ST: Spodosols)

That order groups all soils where main soil developing process was podzolisation, spodic horizon is diagnostic for that group.
- Type 6.1 "Podzolic soils" (Polish: Gleby bielicowe; WRB: Haplic or Orsteinic or Gleyic Podzol; ST: Typic or Oxyaquic or Aquic Haplorthods, Spodic Udipsamments, Humaqueptic Psammaquents, Typic Duraquods, Typic or Umbric or Histic Endoaquods)
- Type 6.2 "Podzols" (Polish: Bielice; WRB: Albic Podzol, Albic Orstenic or Stagnic or Gleyic Podzol; ST: Typic Haplohumods, Spdic Udipsamments, Typic or Oxyaquic Haplorthods, Humaqueptic Psammaquents, Typic Duraquods, Typic Epiaquods, Typic Endoaquods)

- Order 7. Chernozemic soils (Polish: Gleby czarnoziemne; WRB: Chernozems, Phaeozems; ST: Mollisols - Aquolls, Udolls)

This order includes all soils with deep humus horizon, accumulated in both: wet or dry conditions. They are usually fertile, there is predominance of humin acids and presence of organic-mineral connections.
- Type 7.1 "Chernozems" (Polish: Czarnoziemy; WRB: Calcic or Haplic or Luvic or Stagnic Chernozem; ST: Typic or Cumulic or Entic or Aquic Hapludolls)
- Type 7.2 "Black soils" (Polish: Czarne ziemie; WRB: Gleyic or Gleyic Calcic or Luvic Chernozem, Gleyic or Haplic or Luvic Phaeozem; ST: Typic or Cumulic Endoaquolls)
- Type 7.3 "Chernozemic rendzinas" (Polish: Rędziny czarnoziemne; WRB: Rendzic Phaeozem; ST: Typic or Inceptic Haplrendolls)
- Type 7.4 "Chernoziemic fluvisols" (Polish: Mady czarnoziemne; WRB: Mollic Fluvisol, Endofluvic Phaeozem; ST: Fluvaquentic Endoaquolls)
- Type 7.5 "Chernoziemic deluvial soils" (Polish: Gleby deluwialne czarnoziemne; WRB: Mollic Gleysol (Colluvic); ST: Typic or Cumulic Endoaquolls)
- Type 7.6 "Mucky soils" (Polish: Gleby murszaste; WRB: Mollic or Umbric Gleysol; ST: Mollic or Histic Endoaquolls)

- Order 8. Gley soils (Polish: Gleby glejoziemne; WRB: Gleysols; ST: Entisols - Aquents)

In this order are wet soils with domination of gleyic conditions caused by shallow groundwater.
- Type 8.1 "Gley soils" (Polish: Gleby glejowe; WRB: Haplic or Molic or Histic Gleysol; ST: Typic Endoaquents, Typic Hydraquents, Mollic Haplaquents, Mollic or Humaqueptic Psammaquents)

- Order 9. Vertisols (Polish: Vertisole; WRB: Vertisols; ST: Vertisols)

This order covers soils built of swelling clay minerals (mainly montmorillonite) what causes cyclic soil material volume change.
- Type 9.1 "Dystrophic vertisols" (Polish: Vertisole dystroflczne; WRB: Haplic Vertisol (Dystric); ST: Typic Dystruderts)
- Type 9.2 "Eutrophic vertisols" (Polish: Vertisole eutroficzne; WRB: Haplic Vertisol (Eutric); ST: Chromic Hapluderts)
- Type 9.3 "Humus vertisols" (Polish: Vertisole próchniczne; WRB: Mollic Vertisol; ST: Typic Hapluderts)

- Order 10. Organic soils (Polish: Gleby organiczne; WRB: Histosols; ST: Histosols)

That order groups all soils built of organic material (>12–18% organic carbon), mainly accumulated in wet conditions.
- Type 10.1 "Peat fibric soils" (Polish: Gleby torfowe fibrowe; WRB: Fibric or Fibric Hemic or Limnic Fibric Histosol; ST: Typic or Hemic or Limnic Haplofibrists)
- Type 10.2 "Peat hemic soils" (Polish: Gleby torfowe hemowe; WRB: Hemic or Sapric Hemic or Fibric Hemic or Limnic Hemic Histosol; ST: Typic or Sapric or Fibric or Limnic or Fluvaquentic or Terric Haplohemists)
- Type 10.3 "Peat sapric soils" (Polish: Gleby torfowe saprowe; WRB: Sapric or Fibric Sapric or Hemic Sapric or Limnic Sapric Histosol; ST: Typic or Hemic or Limnic or Fluvaquentic or Terric Haplosaprists)
- Type 10.4 "Organic detritus soils" (Polish: Gleby organiczne ściółkowe; WRB: Folic or Folic Leptic Histosol; ST: Typic or Lithic Udifolists)
- Type 10.5 "Organic limnic soils" (Polish: Gleby organiczne limnowe; WRB: Limnic or Hemic Limnic Histosol; ST: Limnic Haplohemists)
- Type 10.6 "Organic mucky soils" (Polish: Gleby organiczne murszowe; WRB: Fibric Sapric or Hemic Sapric or Sapric or Limnic Sapric Histosol (Drainic); ST: Muck Haplofibrists)

- Order 11. Anthropogenic soils (Polish: Gleby antropogeniczne; WRB: Anthrosols, Technosols; ST: Inceptisols - Anthrept)

This order covers soils visibly changed by human activity, not only industrial and associated with urbanization but also connected with intensive agriculture.
- Type 11.1 "Agriculture soils" (Polish: Gleby kulturoziemne; WRB: Plaggic or Hortic Anthrosol, Haplic Phaeozem (Anthric), Haplic Chernozem (Anthric); ST: Typic Plagganthrepts, Typic Haplanthrepts)
- Type 11.2 "Industrial soils" (Polish: Gleby industroziemne; WRB: Technic Regosol, Technic Anthrosol, Mollic Technosol; ST: Typic or Mollic Udarents)
- Type 11.3 "Urban soils" (Polish: Gleby urbiziemne; WRB: Urbic or Mollic or Ecranic Technosol; ST: Typic or Mollic Udarents)
- Type 11.4 "Salty and saline soils" (Polish: Gleby słone i zasolone; WRB: Haplic Solochaks; ST: Natrudalfs, Natraquolls)

== Geological origin of bedrock and soil texture ==
Geological origin of bedrock described by rodzaj gleby describes geological origin and properties of material from which the soil was formed. It is not the same as soil family from USDA Soil Taxonomy. Examples can be: granitoid, basalt, amphibolite, sandstone, limestone (with specified period of formation), gypsum, glacial till, sandur sand, loess and others.

Sizes of soil particles and texture of soil material are very similar to USDA classification. It makes possible correlating results of particle size analysis of soils described using USDA and Polish Soil Classification systems.

| Name of soil separate | Diameter limits (mm) |
|---|---|
| Clay | less than 0.002 |
| Silt | 0.002–0.05 |
| Sand | 0.05–2.00 |
| Gravel | 2.00–75.00 |
| Cobbles | 75.00–200.00 |
| Stones | 200.00–600.00 |
| Bouldres | more than 600.00 |

== Bibliography ==
Marcinek, Jerzy; Komisarek, Jolanta (2011). "Systematyka gleb Polski. Wydanie 5" [Polish Soil Classification. 5th edition]. Roczniki Gleboznawcze - Soil Science Annual (in Polish). 62/3. Polskie Towarzystwo Gleboznawcze. ISSN 2300-4975.
