= Soil in the United States =

The USDA soil taxonomy hierarchy includes orders, suborders, great groups, subgroups, families and series, with each series representing a unique kind of soil. In the United States, over 20,000 soil series have been identified. Soil maps and associated data are available for more than 95 percent of the nation’s counties.

== Composition ==
The percentages of land area (in the US and associated territories, etc.) occupied by soils of the twelve orders have been estimated as:

type	percent
Alfisols	14
Andisols	1.7
Aridisols	8.3
Entisols	12.3
Gelisols	8.7
Histosols	1.6
Inceptisols	9.7
Mollisols	21.5
Oxisols	0.02
Spodosols	3.5
Ultisols	9.2
Vertisols	2.0

== Regional distribution of soil orders ==
Alfisols and Inceptisols occur widely in the US, but the circumstances of their occurrence would be difficult to characterize briefly. The Alfisols have a subsurface ("B") horizon characterized by phyllosilicate clay accumulation (suggesting illuviation of such clay from above). The Inceptisols have a weakly developed B horizon as a consequence of weathering and/or other processes.

Andisols are found in areas where soils have formed in certain kinds of volcanic ejecta (usually pumice and/or volcanic ash).

Aridisols occur in parts of the western United States which are too dry for the growth of mesophytic plants.

Entisols, which exhibit little soil profile development, are characteristic of areas where soil parent materials have quite recently been deposited, e.g. on recent river alluvium.

In the US, Gelisols occur only in parts of Alaska; they are characterized by having permafrost within 100 cm of the surface.

Histosols are organic soils lacking permafrost within 100 cm of the surface; they are characteristically formed on wet sites, e.g. bogs, some fens and some muskeg areas. Some Histosols have been drained, especially to permit cultivation.

In the US, Mollisols occur mostly on the Great Plains, and in some areas of the west. There is a considerable variety of Mollisols, including soils very closely resembling the Chernozem ("black earth") of eastern Europe (parts of Russia, Ukraine and neighboring regions), and the Chernozemic soils of the Canadian prairies.

Oxisols occur only in tropical environments, which have very limited extent in the US.

Spodosols often occur under coniferous forest in cool, moist climates, such as southeastern Alaska, the Great Lakes region, the northeastern U.S., and higher elevations of the northwestern states. Spodosols are also found in warm, moist environments such as Florida and in fact are the most prominent soil order of the state. Spodosols have a B horizon containing a relatively high concentration of illuviated aluminum with accompanying illuviated organic matter, and in many cases, illuviated iron. Such horizons form under certain acidic leaching conditions influenced by acid decomposition products of litter accumulations under certain tree and/or shrub species. The Spodosols correspond to the Podzols of Russia, Central Europe and Northern Europe and to the Podzolic soils found in much of Canada's boreal forest.)

Ultisols are rather extensive in warm, humid regions of the US. They tend to represent rather advanced soil development, and thus are found on relatively old land surfaces.

Vertisols are not extensive in the US, being confined to areas where there is a great abundance of swelling clays, e.g. montmorillonite, that cause churning of soils as a consequence of wetting and drying cycles.

== Soil series ==
The Soil series is the lowest category of the national soil classification system. The name of a soil series is the common reference term, used to name soil map units. Soil series are the most homogenous classes in the system of taxonomy. The descriptions contain soil properties that define the soil series, distinguish it from other soil series, serve as the basis for the placement of that soil series in the soil family, and provide a record of soil properties needed to prepare soil interpretations.

== History of soil data in the US ==
The original federal authority for the soil survey of the United States is contained in the record of the 53rd Congress, chapter 169, Agricultural Appropriations Act of 1896.

Today, soil survey is conducted via the National Cooperative Soil Survey Program (NCSS). The NCSS is a partnership led by the United States Department of Agriculture's Natural Resources Conservation Service of Federal land management agencies, state agricultural experiment stations, counties, conservation districts, and other special-purpose districts that provide soil survey information necessary for understanding, managing, conserving and sustaining the nation's soil resources.

== USDA Soil Taxonomy ==
The soil classification system is similar to the way that living organisms, including plants and animals, are classified into groups based on physical, chemical and morphological properties. Soil scientists classify soils into hierarchical taxonomic categories including order, suborder, great group, subgroup, family and series. The broadest category is the soil order. The smallest unit is the series, which is akin to the species level of plant and animal taxonomic classification. The soil taxonomy system used in the United States was primarily developed by the United States Department of Agriculture (USDA).

== Accessing soil data ==
Web Soil Survey (WSS) provides soil data and information produced by the National Cooperative Soil Survey. It is operated by the USDA Natural Resources Conservation Service (NRCS) and provides access to the largest natural resource information system in the world. NRCS has soil maps and data available online for more than 95 percent of the nation’s counties and anticipates having 100 percent in the near future. The site is updated and maintained online as the single authoritative source of soil survey information.

== Factors contributing to soil diversity ==
Soils are the product of climate, organisms, and topography, acting on parent (geologic) material over time. Thus the great diversity of geologic materials, geomorphic processes, climatic conditions, biotic assemblages and land surface ages in the United States is responsible for the presence of an enormous variety of mineral and organic soils. (Most of the mineral soils contain significant quantities of organic matter, but not enough to qualify for classification as organic soils.)

Across soils, the soil texture (inorganic particles of mineral soils) vary greatly in size distribution, often as a result of transport and deposition of the parent material from which the soil is formed. Examples include loess (wind-deposited silt), dune sands, alluvial (river-deposited) sands and silts, and glacial till (which may include substantial amounts of clay, silt, sand, gravel and larger particles).

Compared with sands (0.05 to 2 mm in diameter), silts (0.002 to 0.05 mm in diameter) have a very much larger specific surface area (i.e. particle surface area per unit mass). At the surface of a particle, weathering processes occur. If the particle contains potential plant nutrients in mineral form, such processes result in the release of the nutrients in readily available, ionic form. Thus, a high specific surface is a major reason why silty soils tend to be relatively fertile. Clay mineral particles are finer than silt, being less than 0.002 mm in diameter. Soils high in sand are often referred to as 'coarser-textured soils' and soils high clay and silt are referred to as 'finer-textured soils'.

There are pore spaces between soil particles and between soil structure (structure, or soil aggregates, consist of numerous organic and inorganic particles bonded together). Particle size and structure determine the size of pores in a soil. The pore size influences how water, air, nutrients, and biology interact with the soil. Water retention tends to be greater in the finer-textured soils. If a fine-textured soil is well aggregated, the large pores between aggregates will facilitate drainage and aeration. (In contrast, drainage and aeration can be poor in poorly aggregated fine-textured soils in which nearly all of the pore space consists of fine pores, which restrict water movement.) Drainage is occurs quickly and thus trafficability is usually greater in the coarser-textured soils.

While some of the clay in a soil may have been inherited in the parent material, older soils might contain a significant amount of clay formed by weathering processes during soil formation. Soils with a high concentration of clay and organic matter tend to have considerable net negative electrical charge, conferring the ability to retain many plant nutrient cations (e.g. Ca2+, Mg2+, K+, NH4+), readily available to plants by ion exchange. Plant nutrients are also released from soil organic matter by decomposition, and organic matter is particularly significant as the major form in which soil nitrogen is stored. Organic matter contributes to aggregation and water-retention properties of soil.

Soil chemical composition reflects not only the original geologic materials (e.g. limestone, granite, basalt), but also soil-forming processes since deposition. In much of the northern US, soil formation commenced either shortly after glacial retreat at the end of the last Ice Age or even more recently. Elsewhere in the US, one may find some older land surfaces where soil formation has occurred over a much longer period, in addition to some young soils.

Given sufficient time, an undifferentiated soil will evolve a soil profile that consists of two or more layers, referred to as soil horizons. These differ in one or more properties such as in their texture, structure, density, porosity, consistency, temperature, color, and reactivity.

There are 12 soil orders in the U.S.

== Soil contamination and remediation ==
Although the United States has many sites with contaminated soils, it has been a leader in defining and implementing standards for cleanup. Each year, thousands of sites complete soil contamination cleanup, some by using microbes that “eat up” toxic chemicals in soil, many others by simple excavation and others by soil vapor extraction, air stripping, or solvent extraction, with the choice of method influenced by the nature of the contaminants involved as well as by costs and extent of the contamination. In 1980, the U.S.Superfund/CERCLA established strict rules on legal liability for soil contamination. CERCLA stimulated the identification and cleanup of thousands of sites. It encouraged property buyers and sellers to consider soil contamination and its implications when property transfers occur.

== See also ==
- List of U.S. state soils
- USDA soil taxonomy
- List of Superfund sites in the United States
- Agriculture in the United States
- National Cooperative Soil Survey
- Soil
- Natural Resources Conservation Service
