= Greyzem =

Soil classification used in the FAO soil classification system

- Used in: FAO soil classification
- Parent material: decalcified unconsolidated materials including eolian, fluvial and lacustrine deposits, solifluction material and glacial till.

Greyzem (from Anglo-Saxon, grey, and Russian, zemlja, earth) is a soil classification used in the FAO soil classification system which was introduced with the UNESCO Soil Map of the World in 1978. The name is connotative of uncoated silt and quartz grains which are present in layers rich in organic matter. It was one of the original 26 Great Groups and remained as one of the 28 groups in the 1988 revised version.

Along with chernozems, kastanozems, and phaeozems, these four soil groups form a set of soil groups that are mainly found in steppe (aka pampa in South America or prairie in Northern America) regions. These soils are all characterized by a mollic horizon and vegetation of dry forests and ephemeral grasses where accumulation of organic matter dominates over leaching processes.

The greyzem classification contains two Soil Units:

- Gleyic greyzems – Greyzems showing gleyic properties within 100 cm of the surface
- Haplic greyzems – Greyzems lacking gleyic properties within 100 cm of the surface

The term gleyic comes from the Russian local word gley meaning "mucky soil mass" while haplic comes from the Greek haplous (simple) which is meant to connote soils with a simple, normal horizons sequence.

Taxonomically, Greyzem would most closely correlate to Dark Grey Chernozem under the Canadian System of Soil Classification and Albolls and Boralfic Boroll subgroups under USDA soil taxonomy.
