= Sławomir Miklaszewski =

Polish soil scientist and university teacher

- Born: 11 November 1874; Augustów, Suwałki Governorate, Congress Poland, Russian Empire
- Died: 5 January 1949 (aged 74); Iłża, Poland
- Citizenship: Poland
- Education: University of Warsaw
- Scientific career
- Fields: Soil science
- Workplaces: Jagellonian University, Museum of Industry and Agriculture, Warsaw University of Technology

Sławomir Miklaszewski (11 November 1874 in Augustów, Poland – 5 January 1949 in Iłża) was a Polish soil scientist, professor of Warsaw University of Technology, and founder of the Polish pedologic school.

Miklaszewski graduated from the University of Warsaw in 1899, where he studied mainly analytical chemistry. For the next two years he held the position of senior assistant to Professor Emil Godlewski senior, at the Chair of Agricultural Chemistry, Jagellonian University in Cracow (Kraków). From 1901, he organized the Laboratory of Soil Science at the Museum of Industry and Agriculture in Warsaw, of which he later became the head. In 1919, the Laboratory became a part of the Warsaw University of Technology, where, as a professor, Miklaszewski worked until the end of his life. In 1946 he was elected honorary president of the Polish Pedological Society.

Professor Miklaszewski was very active in the scientific, didactic, organizational and publishing fields. He created the original Polish school of soil science, equilibrating the geologico-substancional intellectual tradition of Albrecht Thaer and Frederic Fallou and the new Russian genetico-typological school of Vasily Dokuchaev. He was describing the soil as the product of oro-hydrographic, climatic, and geologic conditions of the country in which it occurs. In this spirit he created original The outline of preliminary classification of Polish soils dividing all soils into three basic groups: silicate soils, calcic soils and humus soils. His soil classification was used in Poland till 50. of XX c. and influenced next editions of Polish Soil Classification. His most important publications are: Soil Map of the Kingdom of Poland 1:500 000 (1907)-the world's first soil map covering such a large area witch such accurancy; Soil Map of Lithuania (1924) and Soil Map of Poland (1927) 1:500 000 as well as manuals and monographs Recognition of Soils in Poland and Soils of Poland.

Miklaszewski was a world-renowned scientist, actively participating in works of International Pedologie Congresses as well as the International Society of Soil Science. He introduced the term "rendzina" from Polish language to the international nomenclature of soil science.

== Bibliography ==
- Radziewicz, Joanna (2008). "Sławomir Miklaszewski – wybitny polski gleboznawca". Rolniczy Magazyn Elektroniczny (in Polish). Centralna Biblioteka Rolnicza im. Michała Oczapowskiego. ISSN 1734-3070.
- Strzemski, Michał (1976). "Sławomir Miklaszewski jako twórca polskiej szkoły gleboznawczej" (PDF). Roczniki Gleboznawcze - Soil Science Annual (in Polish). 27 (2): 11–18. ISSN 2300-4975.
- Kuźnicki, Franciszek (1974). "Scientific activity of Sławomir Miklaszewski in the 100th anniversary of his birth" (PDF). Roczniki Gleboznawcze - Soil Science Annual. 25: 3–13. ISSN 2300-4975.
