= Anthrepts =

In the USDA soil taxonomy, Anthrepts is a term for soil with evidence of human habitation and farming.

== See also ==
- Anthrosols in the World Soil Classification.
- Inceptisols of which anthrepts are a suborder of.
