= Alina Kabata-Pendias =

Polish chemist (1929–2019)

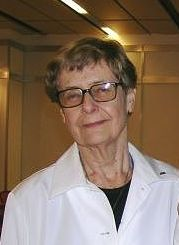
Alina Kabata-Pendias (2007)

Alina Kabata-Pendias (8 September 1929 – 3 April 2019) was a Polish chemist working in the field of biogeochemistry and soil science. She was a professor of agricultural sciences associated with the Institute of Soil Science and Plant Cultivation in Puławy (IUNG), and the State Geological Institute (PGI). She was a specialist in the field of biogeochemistry of trace elements. Her husband was Henryk Pendias, a geologist and geochemist at PGI. Among other awards, she was the recipient of the Golden Cross of Merit, Order of Polonia Restituta, and the Armia Krajowa Cross.

== Early life and education ==
Alina Kabata was born in Baranavichy on 8 September 1929. She was the daughter of Helena, née Wojciechowicz, and Piotr Kabata, a Polish officer, at that time in the Border Protection Corps. She spent her childhood in various places in the Eastern Borderlands of the Second Polish Republic. During World War II, the whole family managed to get to the Kielce region in the General Government. From 1940, under the pseudonyms of "Żar" and "Wujek", the father was the commander of the Szydłów AK District and commanded an independent Home Army subversive unit. Like the other family members, young Alina was involved in the Polish resistance (nicknamed "Cicia"). Her brother was Zbigniew Kabata.

Kabata-Pendias received degrees at the Institute of Soil Science and Plant Cultivation in Pulawy (Ph.D.) and at the Agricultural University of Lublin (D.Sc.).

== Career ==
Kabata-Pendias was the manager or contractor of many scientific projects, including three in cooperation with USDA Agricultural Research Service: "Distribution of micronutrients among soil minerals" (1961–1966), "The occurrence and behavior of trace elements in residual soils" (1969–1975), and "The impact of copper mining and industrial activity of Lower Silesia on the chemical composition of plants" (1975–1979). She was a consultant and lecturer for FAO, UNEP, MAB, SCOPE, SETAC, and IUPAC. She was the promoter of seven doctoral dissertations. She published over 300 scientific papers, many of international coverage, including books in Polish, English and Russian. Her team's work Evaluation of soil pollution with heavy metals and sulfur. Framework guidelines for agriculture between 1993 and 2002 was the only source for assessing the degree of environmental pollution by trace elements in Poland. She actively participated in the work of numerous committees of the Polish Academy of Sciences, including the chair of the Committee for Analysis for Agricultural Need of the Polish Academy of Sciences, and the MAB-9 Team of the Human and Environment Committee of the Polish Academy of Sciences. She was a member of many scientific societies, including Polish Soil Science Society, Polish Mineralogical Society and Polish Geological Society, as well as the International Union of Soil Sciences, Society for Environmental Geochemistry and Health, the International Association for Study of Clay, and the New York Academy of Sciences. She sat on the presidium of the International Society of Trace Element Biochemistry.

She died on 3 April 2019.

== Awards and honors ==
Kabata-Pendias received many awards for her achievements. The most important were:

- PTG Gold Badge (1972)
- Golden Cross of Merit (1979)
- Knight's Order of Polonia Restituta (1990)
- Badge of Home Army soldiers (1992)
- Armia Krajowa Cross (1994)
- IUNG Director Award (1994)
- Guerrilla Cross (1995)
- Golden Badge of the Ministry of the Environment and Water Management (1995)
- 1st degree team award granted by the Minister of Agriculture and Food Economy (1995)
- Veterans Badge of Fight for Independence (1996)
- Medal of the Rector of the Agricultural University of Lublin (1999)
- Philippe Duchaufour Medal (2007)
- Medal of the 75th Anniversary of the Soil Science Society of Poland (2012)

== Selected works ==
- Trace Elements in Biological Environment (1979)
- Biogeochemistry of Trace Elements (1993, 1999)
- Trace Elements in Soils and Plants (1984, 1989, 1992, 2001)
