= Flatwood =

Flatwood is a soil series with impaired drainage that occurs in the southeastern United States. Flatwood soils are upland soils formed from marine sediments. A shallow water table plays a role in soil formation; typically the water table is only a few feet deep and fluctuates during the year. Flatwood soils are classified in USDA soil taxonomy as fine, mixed, semiactive, mesic Aquic Hapludults.

== See also ==
- Ultisols
