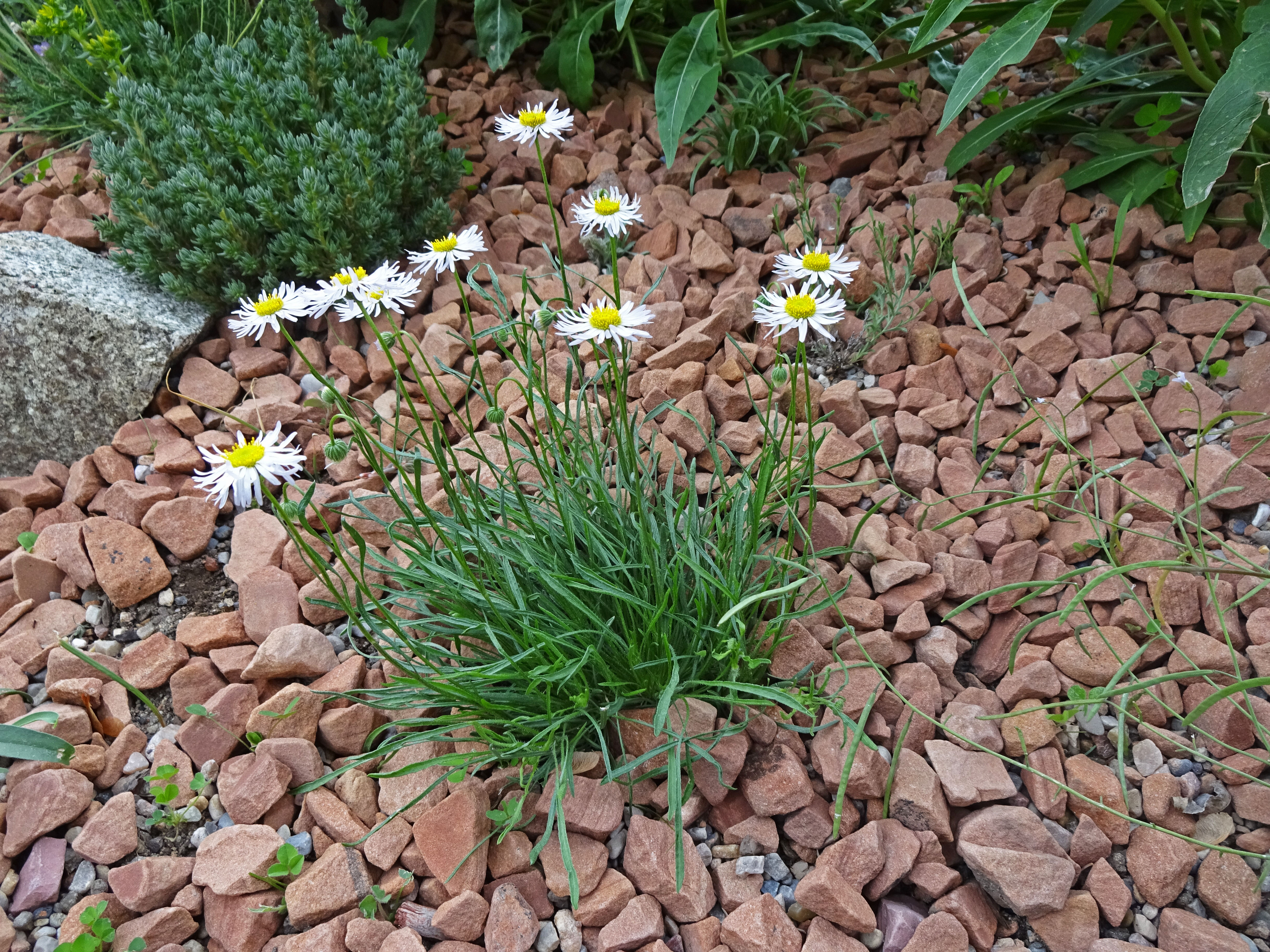

Conservation status
- Secure (NatureServe)

Scientific classification
- Kingdom: Plantae
- Clade: Tracheophytes
- Clade: Angiosperms
- Clade: Eudicots
- Clade: Asterids
- Order: Asterales
- Family: Asteraceae
- Genus: Erigeron
- Species: E. engelmannii

Binomial name
- Erigeron engelmannii A.Nelson

= Erigeron engelmannii =

Species of flowering plant

Erigeron engelmannii is a North American species of flowering plants in the family Asteraceae known by the common name Engelmann's fleabane.

Erigeron engelmannii is native to the western United States. It has been found in Arizona, New Mexico, Utah, Colorado, Wyoming, the Black Hills of South Dakota, Idaho, southern Montana, northeastern Oregon, and southeastern Washington. It is common in lithosols.

Erigeron engelmannii is a perennial herb up to 30 centimeters (12 inches) in height. It produces 1–3 flower heads per stem, each head as many as 100 white, pink, or blue ray florets surrounding numerous yellow disc florets.
