= Solonetz =

Soil type

Solonetz profile

Solonetz (Ukrainian: Солонець, Russian: Солоне́ц, IPA: [səlɐˈnʲɛts]) is a Reference Soil Group of the World Reference Base for Soil Resources (WRB). They have, within the upper 100 cm of the soil profile, a so-called "natric horizon" ("natrium" is the Latin term for sodium). A subsurface horizon (subsoil), higher in clay content than the upper horizon, has more than 15% exchangeable sodium. The name is based on the Russian соль (sol, meaning salt). The Ukrainian folk word "solontsi" means salty soil. In Ukraine, many villages are called Solontsi.

Solonetz zones are associated with Gleysols, Solonchaks and Kastanozems.

In USDA soil taxonomy, Solonetz corresponds to sodium-rich Alfisols.

== See also ==
- Chott
- Salt marsh
- Soil salinity
- Solonchak
- Takir
- Salt pan
