= Albeluvisols =

Soil type

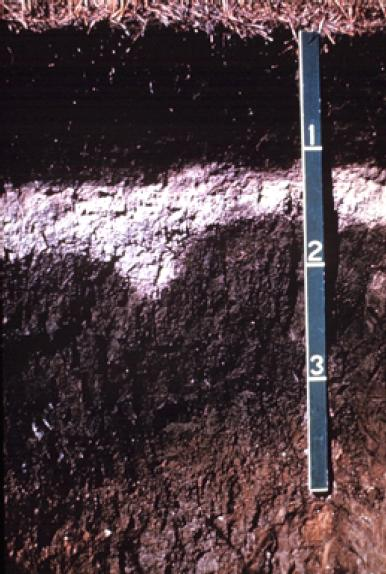
- an Albic horizon
- Used in: WRB, 1st edition 1998 and 2nd edition 2006
- Climate: subarctic, humid continental

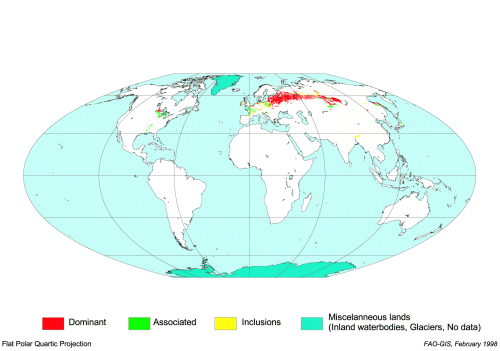
Distribution of Albeluvisols

Albeluvisol was a Reference Soil Group of the first edition (1998) and the second edition (2006) of the World Reference Base for Soil Resources (WRB). In the third edition of the WRB (2014), Albeluvisols were replaced by the broader defined Retisols. An Albeluvisol is a soil with a thin, dark surface horizon on a bleached subsurface horizon (an albic horizon) that tongues into a clay illuviation (Bt) horizon. The Bt horizon has an irregular or broken upper boundary resulting from the tonguing of bleached soil material into the illuviation horizon. Albeluvisols correlate with Glossaqualfs, Glossocryalfs and Glossudalfs in the USDA soil taxonomy.

These soils are formed mostly in unconsolidated glacial till, lacustrine or fluvial materials or aeolian deposits such as loess. They occur on flat to undulating plains under coniferous forest or mixed forest in boreal and temperate climates with cold winters and short cool summers.

The agricultural suitability of Albeluvisols is limited because of their acidity, low nutrient levels, tillage and drainage problems. In northern regions there is also a short growing season and severe frost during the long winter. The Albeluvisols of the northern taiga zone are almost exclusively under forest with small areas used for pasture or hay fields. In the southern taiga zone, less than 10 percent of the non-forested area is used for livestock farming. In the southern and western parts of the taiga in Russia arable crops, such as cereals, potatoes, sugar beet and forage maize, are found, especially on soils with higher base saturations in the subsoil.

Albeluvisols cover an estimated 320 million ha in Europe, North Asia, Central Asia and in North America. They are concentrated in two regions:

- the continental regions that had permafrost in the Pleistocene of northeast Europe, northwest Asia and southern Canada, which constitute by far the largest areas of Albeluvisols;
- the loess and cover sand areas and old alluvial areas in moist temperate regions, such as France, central Belgium, the southeast of the Netherlands and the north and north-east of Germany.

== See also ==
- Pedogenesis
- Pedology (soil study)
- Soil classification
