= Oxisol =

Soil type known for occurring in tropical rain forests

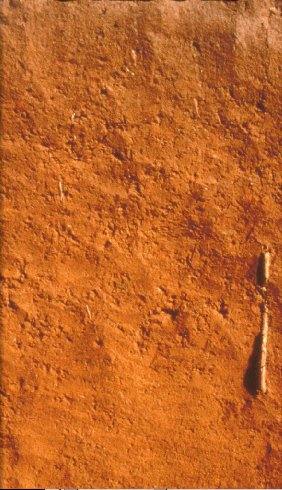
- Oxisol profile
- Used in: USDA soil taxonomy
- Profile: OABC
- Key process: leaching, weathering
- Climate: tropical

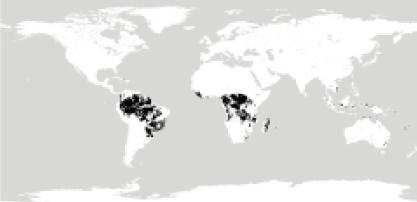
Oxisols of the world

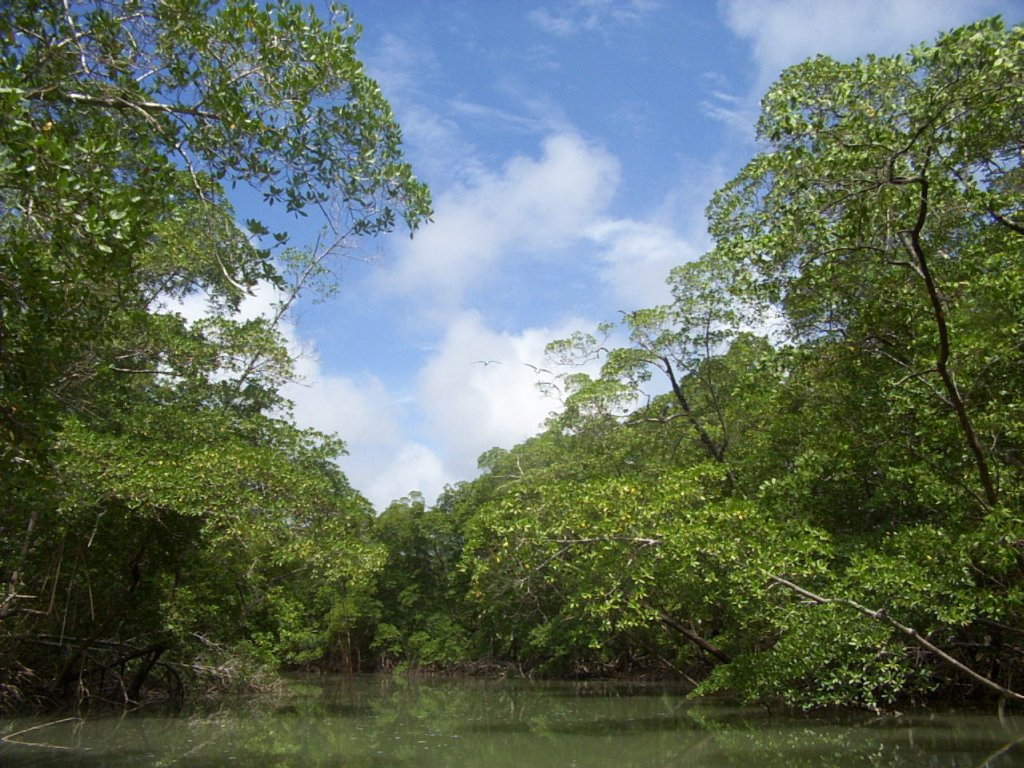
Oxisols are generally associated with the equatorial forest biome

Oxisols are a soil order in USDA soil taxonomy, best known for their occurrence in tropical rain forest within 25 degrees north and south of the Equator. In the World Reference Base for Soil Resources (WRB), they belong mainly to the ferralsols, but some are plinthosols or nitisols. Some oxisols have been previously classified as laterite soils.

== Formation ==
The main processes of soil formation of oxisols are weathering, humification and pedoturbation due to animals. These processes produce the characteristic soil profile. They are defined as soils containing at all depths no more than ten percent weatherable minerals, and low cation exchange capacity. Oxisols are always a red or yellowish color, due to the high concentration of iron(III) and aluminium oxides and hydroxides. They also contain quartz and kaolin, plus small amounts of other clay minerals and organic matter.

== Etymology ==
The word "oxisol" comes from "oxide" in reference to the dominance of oxide minerals such as bauxite. In the World Reference Base for Soil Resources, oxisols are known as ferralsols.

== Occurrence ==
Present-day oxisols are found almost exclusively in tropical areas, in South America and Africa, almost always on highly stable continental cratons.

In Southeast Asia, oxisols are found on remnants of the Cimmerian microcontinent, and on the Shan–Thai terrane. In Thailand, rhodic ferralsols, called Yasothon soils, are said to have formed under humid tropical conditions in the early Tertiary, on an extensive plain later uplifted to form the Khorat Plateau. Characterized by a bright red color, these relict soils occur on uplands in a great semicircle around the southern rim, overlying associated gravel horizons said to have been cleared of sand by termites, in a prolonged and still on-going process of bioturbation. Xanthic ferralsols of the Khorat and Udon series, characterized by a pale yellow to brown color, developed in midlands in processes still under investigation; as are those forming lowland soils resembling European brown soils.

In Australia vast areas formerly covered in rainforest have become so dry that oxisols have formed a hard ironstone cover upon which only skeletal soils can form.

== Genesis ==
Fossil oxisols are known from the first appearance of free oxygen in the atmosphere about 2,200 million years ago. In warm periods like the Mesozoic and Paleocene, oxisols extended to areas that now have quite cool climates, extending well into North America and Europe. It is believed oxisols became vegetated later than ultisols or alfisols, probably because vegetation took a long time to adapt to the infertility of oxisols.

== History ==
Scientists originally thought that the heavy vegetation of tropical rain forests would provide rich nutrients, but as rainfall passes through the litter on the forest floor the rain is acidified and leaches minerals from the above soil layers. This forces plants to get their nutrition from decaying litter as oxisols are quite infertile due to the lack of organic matter and the almost complete absence of soluble minerals leached by the wet and humid climate.

== Uses ==
Oxisols are often used for tropical crops such as cocoa and rubber. In some cases, rice is grown on them. Permanent cropping of oxisols in low-income areas is very difficult because of low cation exchange capacities and high phosphorus fixation on iron and aluminium oxides (ligand exchange mechanism; inner sphere complex with phosphate). However, many oxisols can be cultivated over a wide range of moisture conditions. On this account, oxisols are intensively exploited for agriculture in some regions which have enough wealth to support modern agricultural practices (including regular additions of lime and fertilizer). A recent example of exploitation by modern methods involves the growing of soybeans in Brazil.

== Suborders ==
Oxisols are divided into the following suborders:

- Aquox – oxisols with a water table at or near the surface for much of the year
- Perox – oxisols of continuously humid climates, where precipitation exceeds evapotranspiration in all months
- Torrox – oxisols of arid climates. Because the present climate can never produce enough weathering to produce oxisols, torrox soils are always paleosols formed during periods of much wetter climates. They occur mainly in Southern Africa.
- Ustox – oxisols of semiarid and subhumid climates
- Udox – oxisols of humid climates

== See also ==
- Pedogenesis – Process of soil formation
- Pedology – Study of soils in their natural environment
- Soil classification – Systematic categorization of soils
- Terra preta – Very dark, fertile Amazonian anthropogenic soil
