= Guy D. Smith =

Soil scientist

Guy Donald Smith (1907–1981) was a distinguished international soil scientist, who was born in Atlantic, Iowa.

== Biography ==
Guy graduated from the University of Illinois circa 1929, earned his master's degree from the University of Missouri in 1934, and received his PhD in 1940 from the University of Illinois.

After the bombing of Pearl Harbor, Guy enlisted into the United States Army Air Forces in January 1942. He was first sent to an air base in San Antonio, Texas. Soon after, he was shipped overseas, eventually ending up in India, where he worked on building the Ledo Road. Ledo Road was considered one of the toughest jobs during the war by General Lewis A. Pick, because of the physical labor and harsh conditions of the landscape. The road served as a land supply route to China, via the Burma Road.

Upon returning from his service to the US military, Guy was hired to work for the U.S. Department of Agriculture. In 1946, Guy worked as a soil correlator for the Soil Conservation Service in Iowa, and in 1952 he was made Director of Soil Survey Investigations. As part of his duties, he traveled the world studying and describing soils for the U.S. government. While working for the USDA, Guy was tasked with developing a method for classifying soils. He produced the 1st of seven iterations of what would eventually become a soil taxonomy system used worldwide. Creating a way to classify soils was important because soils are a valuable global resource that we needed to better understand in order to utilize and improve upon. Guy collaborated with European soil scientists in developing Soil Taxonomy. For this and other research publications, Guy received international recognition for his outstanding efforts in soil science.

For his contributions to pedology, Guy received many honors and awards. These include the Department of Agriculture's Distinguished Service Award in 1962, and the Soil Research Award from the American Society of Agronomy in 1964. He was awarded a Doctor of Science degree by the University of Ghent (Belgium) in 1968.

Guy retired from the Soil Conservation Service in 1973. After retirement, he spent time consulting with international partners on the application of Soil Taxonomy worldwide.

Guy died in 1981 in Ghent, Belgium, where he taught at the University of Ghent.

== See also ==
- USDA soil taxonomy
