= Nitisol =

Type of soil

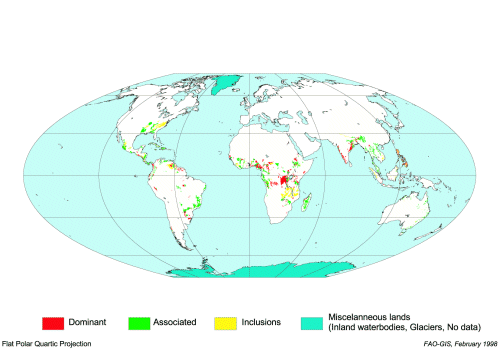
Distribution of nitisols

Nitisol, in the World Reference Base for Soil Resources (WRB), is a deep, red, well-drained soil with a clay content of at least 30% and a polyhedral structure or a blocky structure, breaking into a polyhedral or a flat-edged structure. The soil aggregates show pressure faces. Nitisols correlate with the kandic alfisols, ultisols and inceptisols of the USDA soil taxonomy.

These soils are found in the tropics and subtropics; there are extensive areas of them in the tropical highlands of Ethiopia, Kenya, Democratic Republic of the Congo and Cameroon. Nitisols form from fine-textured material weathered from intermediate to basic parent rock and kaolinite, halloysite and iron oxides dominate their clay mineralogy.

Nitisols are technically defined by a significant accumulation of clay (30 percent or more by mass and extending as much as 150 cm [5 feet] below the surface) and by a blocky aggregate structure. Iron oxides and high-water content are believed to play important roles in creating the soil structure. Nitisols are also strongly influenced by biological activity, resulting in a homogenization of the upper portion of the soil profile. These soils are related to the Alfisol and Inceptisol orders of the U.S. Soil Taxonomy. Related FAO soil groups originating in tropical climates and also containing layers with clay accumulations are Acrisols and Lixisols.

== See also ==
- Pedogenesis
- Pedology
- Soil classification
