= Solonchak =

Type of pale or grey soil

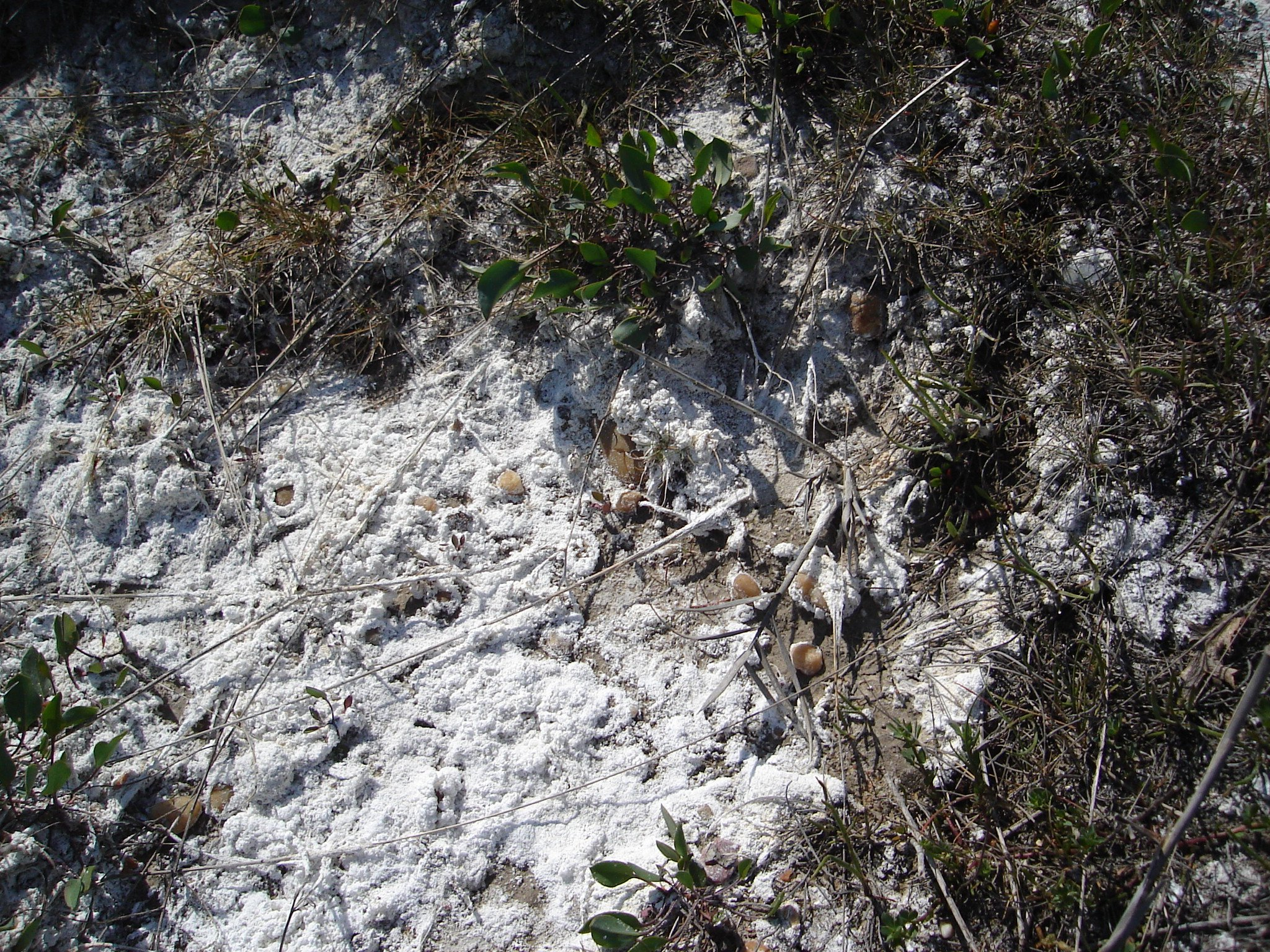
Solonchak ground

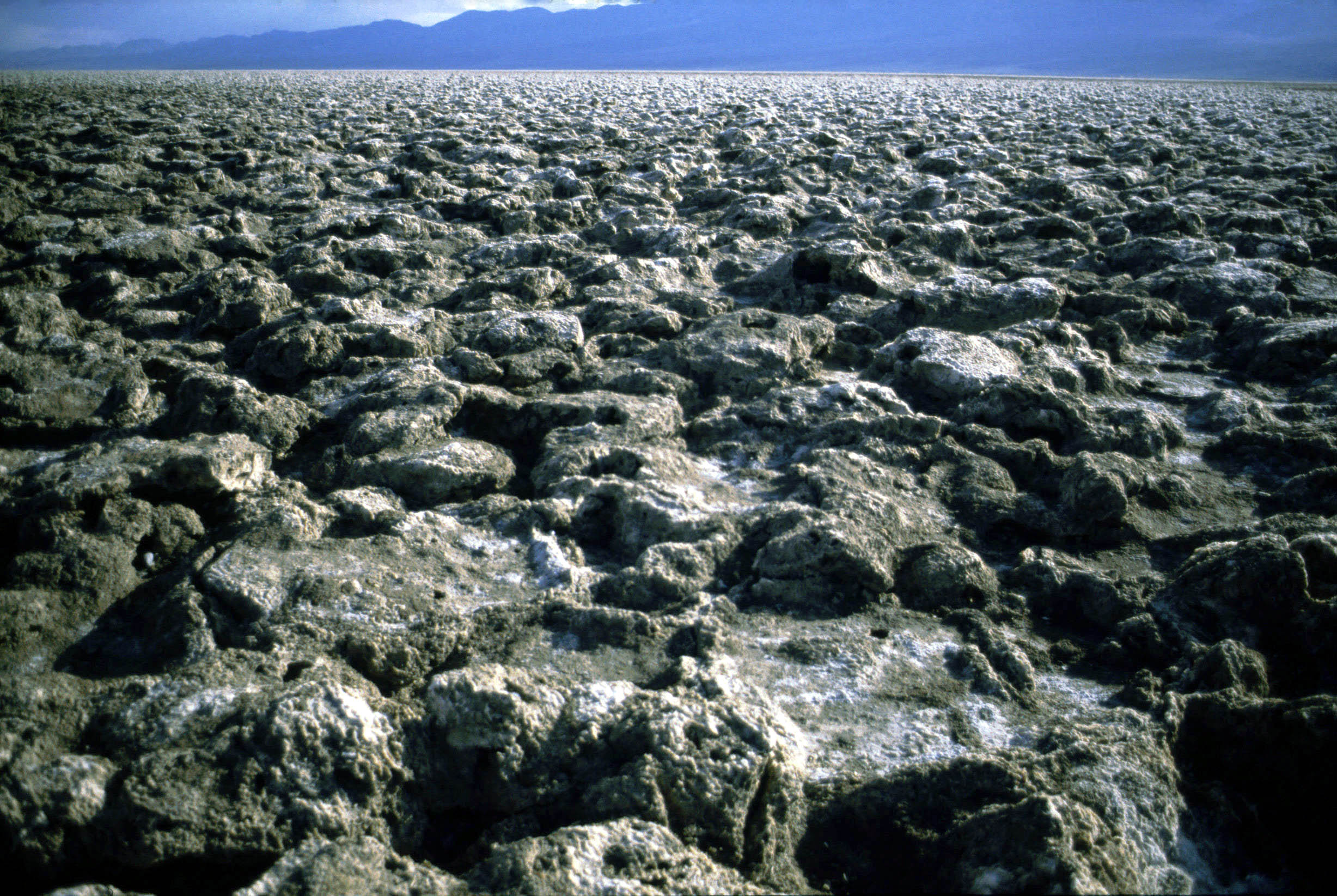
Devil's Golf Course, Death Valley National Park, United States

Solonchak (Russian and Ukrainian: Солончак) is a Reference Soil Group of the World Reference Base for Soil Resources (WRB). It is a pale or grey soil type found in arid to subhumid poorly-drained conditions. The word is Russian for "salt marsh", which is in turn from the Russian sol (соль) "salt".

== See also ==
- Chott
- Solonetz
- Takir
- Salt pan
- Sor (geomorphology)
