= Planosol =

Soil type

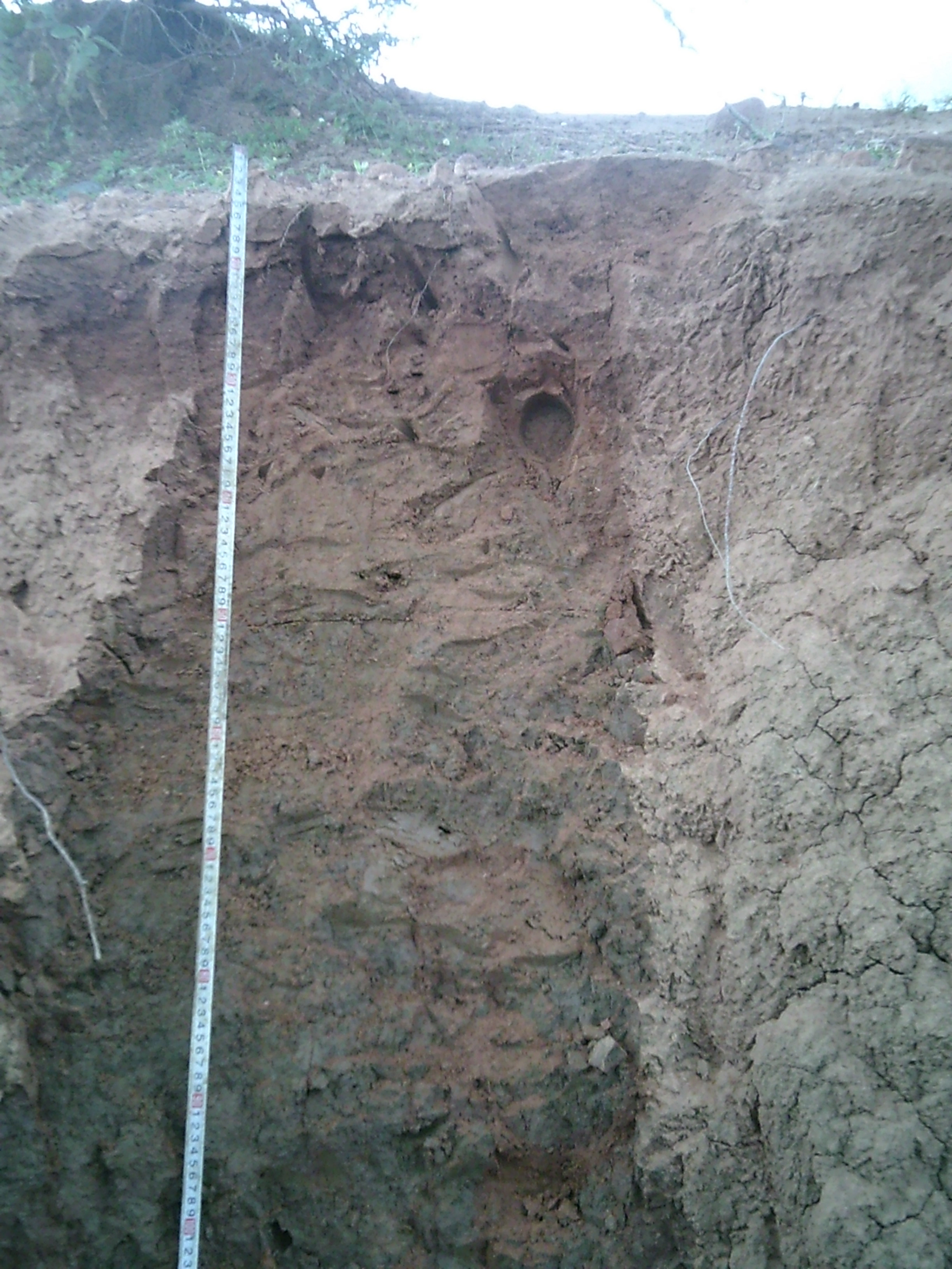
Haplic Planosol profile near Abiy Addi in Ethiopia

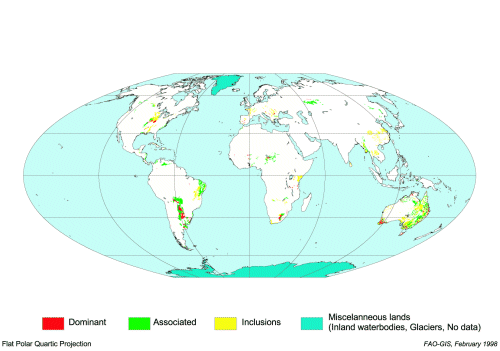
Distribution of Planosols

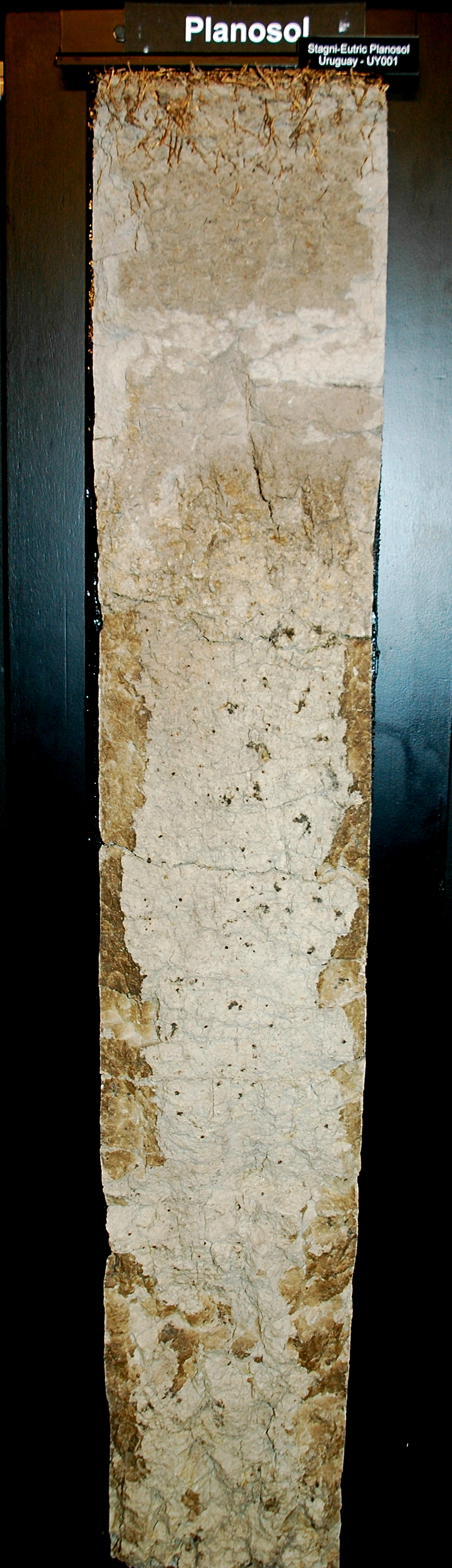
Soil profile of a Eutric Planosol

A Planosol in the World Reference Base for Soil Resources is a soil with a light-coloured, coarse-textured, surface horizon that shows signs of periodic water stagnation and abruptly overlies a dense, slowly permeable subsoil with significantly more clay than the surface horizon. In the US Soil Classification of 1938 used the name Planosols, whereas its successor, the USDA soil taxonomy, includes most Planosols in the Great Groups Albaqualfs, Albaquults and Argialbolls.

== Occurrence ==
These soils are typically in seasonally waterlogged flat lands. They occur mainly in subtropical and temperate, semi-arid and subhumid regions. Planosols are formed mostly in clayey alluvial and colluvial deposits. Geological stratification and/or a pedogenetic process of destruction and removal of clay has resulted in the relatively coarse-textured, light-coloured surface soil abruptly overlying finer textured subsoil; impeded downward percolation of water causes temporarily reducing conditions with a stagnic colour pattern, at least close to the abrupt textural change.

=== Geography ===
Planosols cover an estimated 130 million hectares of the world. Major areas with Planosols occur in subtropical and temperate regions with clear alternation of wet and dry seasons, as in South America (Uruguay, northeastern Argentina, Paraguay, eastern Bolivia, the Brazilian pampa, the Pantanal mato-grossense and northeastern Brazil), Africa (Sahelian zone, East and Southern Africa), the east of the United States of America, Southeast Asia (Bangladesh and Thailand), and Australia.

== Ecology ==
Planosols in their natural state support a sparse grass vegetation, often with scattered shrubs and trees that have shallow root systems that can cope with temporary waterlogging. Agricultural land use on is normally less intensive than that on most other soils under the same climate conditions. Vast areas of Planosols are used for extensive grazing. Wood production on Planosols is much lower than on other soils under the same conditions.

== Agriculture ==
In the temperate zone these soils are mainly in grass or planted to crops such as wheat and sugar beet. Yields are modest even on drained and deeply loosened soils. Root development on natural unmodified Planosols is hindered severely by oxygen deficiency in wet periods, dense subsoil and, in places, by toxic levels of Al in the rootzone. Planosols in Southeast Asia are widely planted with paddy rice. Other crops met with little success. Fertilizers are needed for good yields. In climates with long dry periods and short infrequent wet spells the best land use are grasslands. Strongly developed Planosols with a very silty or sandy surface soil are best left untouched.

== See also ==
- Pedogenesis
- Pedology (soil study)
- Soil classification
