= International Committee on Anthropogenic Soils =

The International Committee on Anthropogenic Soils (ICOMANTH) was a committee active between 1995 and 2013 concerned with classifying soils derived from human activity. According to the National Resources Conservation Service, the committee’s major contribution was "improving technical standards used to describe anthropogenic soils and defining the taxa to classify them". When it was founded, the committee chair was Dr. Ray Bryant, but due to career-related changes, he was succeeded by Dr. John Galbraith in 2004. The committee was considered to have completed its task by the NRCS, and several proposed changes were added to the soil taxonomy in 2014.
