= Orthent =

Type of soil

Orthents are soils defined in USDA soil taxonomy as entisols that lack horizon development due to either steep slopes or parent materials that contain no permanent weatherable minerals (such as ironstone).

Typically, Orthents are exceedingly shallow soils. They are often referred to as skeletal soils or, in the United Nations FAO soil classification, as lithosols.

The basic requirement for recognition of an orthent is that any former soil has been either completely removed or so truncated that characteristics typical of all orders other than entisols are absent.

== Characteristics ==
Most orthents are found in very steep, mountainous regions where erodible material is so rapidly removed by erosion that a permanent covering of deep soil cannot establish itself. Such conditions occur in almost all regions of the world where steep slopes are prevalent.

In Australia and a few regions of Africa, orthents occur in flat terrain because the parent rock contains absolutely no weatherable minerals except short-lived additions from rainfall, so that there is no breaking down of the minerals (chiefly iron oxides) in the rock.

The steepness of most orthents causes the flora on them to be sparse shrubs or grassland. In those on ancient, flat terrain, dry grassland, savanna, or rarely, rainforest can prevail.

Because of their extreme shallowness and, usually, steepness and consequent high erosion hazard, orthents are not suitable for arable farming. The flora typically supported on them is generally of very poor nutritive value for grazing, so that typically only low livestock stocking rates are practicable. Many orthents are very important as habitat for wildlife.

== See also ==
- Pedogenesis
- Pedology
- Soil classification
