= Kastanozem =

Type of soil

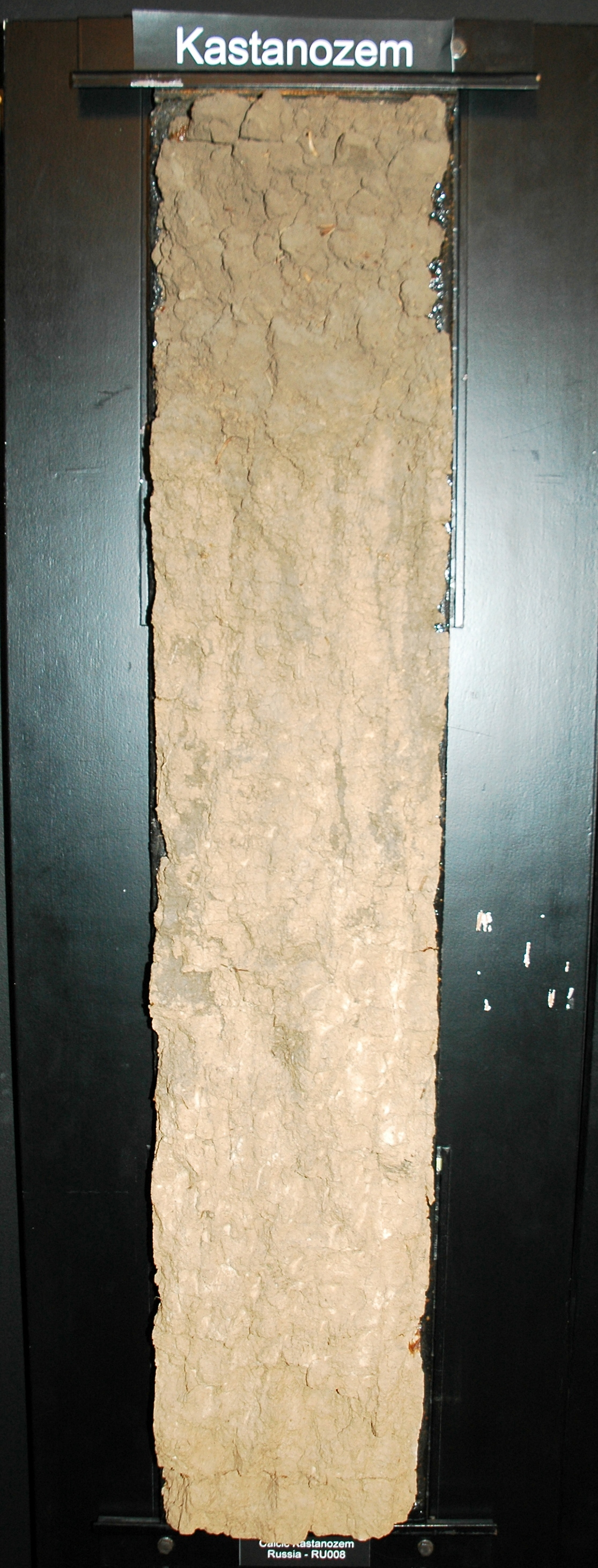
Soil profile of a Calcic Kastanozem

Kastanozem (also known as "chestnut soil") is one of the 32 Reference Soil Groups of the World Reference Base for Soil Resources (WRB). These soils are brighter than Chernozems, and are related to the Mollisols in the USDA soil taxonomy. They are rich in humus, and originally covered with early maturing native grasslands vegetation, which produces a characteristic brown surface layer in the first meter in depth. They have a relative high level of exchangeable calcium ions and secondary carbonates starting within 70 cm of the mineral soil surface.

Kastanozems are found in relatively dry zones with 200 to 450 mm of rainfall a year.

The name has two origins: the Russian term 'каштановые почвы', 'каштанозем', where 'каштановые' is a shade of brown derived from the word "каштан" (kashtan), "chestnut" and refers to the color of its husk, and the Latin term castanea (chestnut).
