= Alfisol =

Clay soil rich in aluminium (Al) and iron (Fe)

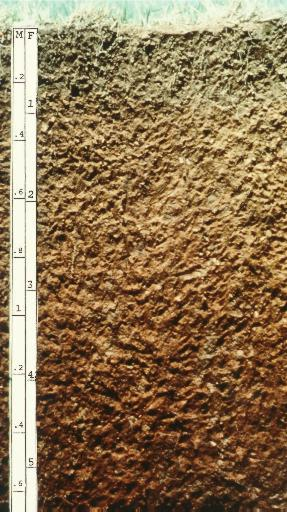
- An Alfisol profile
- Used in: USDA soil taxonomy
- Climate: various

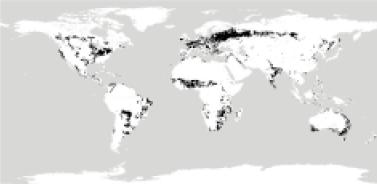
Alfisols of the world

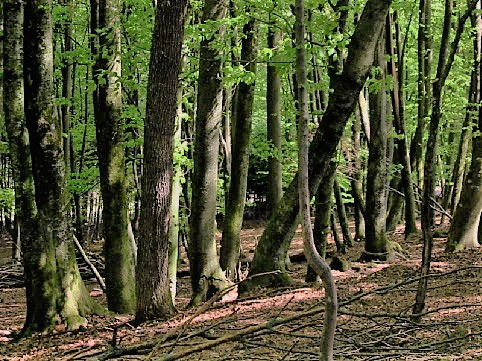
One of the environments in which Alfisols can develop is the Temperate deciduous forest

Alfisols are a soil order in USDA soil taxonomy. Alfisols form in semi-arid to humid areas, typically under a hardwood forest cover. They have a clay-enriched subsoil and relatively high native fertility. "Alf" refers to aluminium (Al) and iron (Fe). Because of their productivity and abundance, Alfisols represent one of the more important soil orders for food and fiber production. They are widely used both in agriculture and forestry, and are generally easier to keep fertile than other humid-climate soils, though those in Australia and Africa are still very deficient in nitrogen and available phosphorus. Those in monsoonal tropical regions, however, have a tendency to acidify when heavily cultivated, especially when nitrogenous fertilizers are used.

In the World Reference Base for Soil Resources (WRB), most Alfisols are classified as Luvisols or Lixisols, but some are classed as Retisols or Nitisols. Aqualfs are mainly Stagnosols or Planosols. Alfisols with a natric horizon are mainly Solonetz.

Alfisols occupy around one-tenth of the Earth's ice-free land surface. They are dominant in many areas, such as the Ohio River basin in the United States, southern and unglaciated Western Europe, the Baltic region and central European Russia, the drier parts of Peninsular India, Sudan in Africa, and many parts of South America.

Alfisols have undergone only moderate leaching. By definition, they have at least 35% base saturation, meaning calcium, magnesium, and potassium are relatively abundant. This is in contrast to Ultisols, which are the more highly leached forest soils having less than 35% base saturation. In eastern North America, Alfisols are commonly found in glaciated areas while Ultisols are restricted to the areas south of the limit of maximum glaciation.

The fossil record of Alfisols begins in the Late Devonian. Probably owing to their fertility, they are the oldest forest soils; vegetation on weathered Oxisols, by contrast, is not known earlier than Middle Permian. Fossil Alfisols remain common from the Carboniferous and all periods since the Eocene.

== Suborders ==
- Aqualfs – This suborder is saturated with water long enough to cause oxygen depletion. Almost all of this suborder is thought to have been forested at some point. Redoximorphic features are present.
- Cryalfs – This suborder occurs mainly in high elevations which tend to be cold with temperatures ranging from greater than 0 C to less than 8 C.
- Udalfs – This suborder is located in humid or subhumid climates. All of this word is thought to have been forested at some point.
- Ustalfs – This suborder is located in semiarid climates with wet summers and dry winters.
- Xeralfs – This suborder is located in mediterranean climates with very dry summers and wet winters.

== Fossil record of Alfisols ==
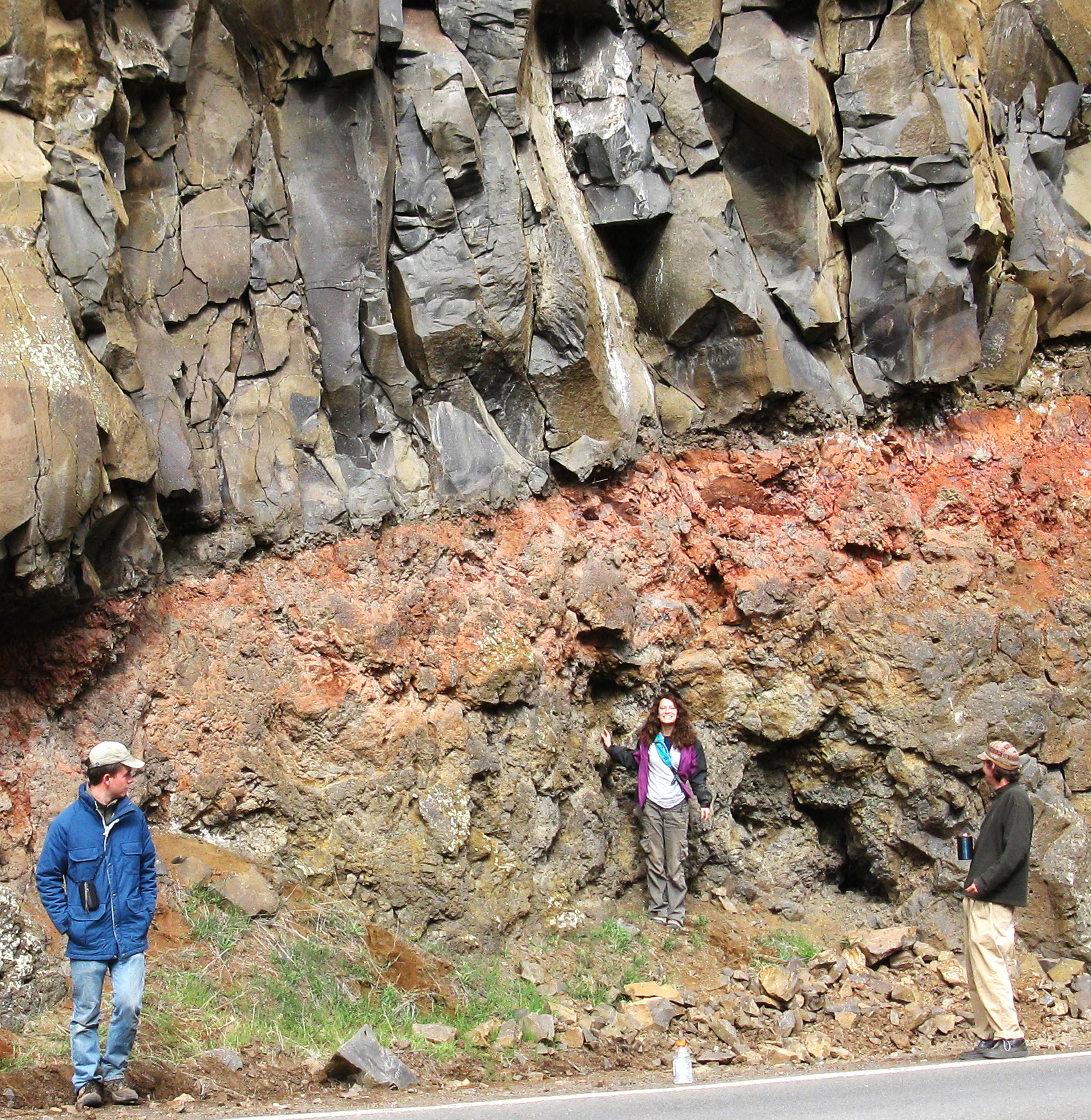
Alfisol between flows of middle Miocene Picture Gorge Basalt in Picture Gorge, Oregon

The fossil record of Alfisols extends back to the Late Devonian. The Alfisol paleosols were woodland soils and early forest soils. The fertile Alfisols were most likely formed by Devonian forests. The oldest of the Alfisol paleosol forest soils are in the paleosols of the Aztec Siltstone in Victoria Land, Antarctica. In the paleosols of the Aztec Siltstone, the Rosemary paleosol, there is evidence for trees from surficial tree-throwing structures and large drab-haloed root tracers. From the fossil wood and spores found in the Aztec Siltstone, there is a strong indication that the trees were Archaeopteris-Callixylon.

In upper New York State, there have been Devonian trees found in a large variety of paleosols. These Devonian trees help give clues as to what ecological tolerances for various early trees looked like. The paleosols associated with progymnosperm trunks are interpreted to not have grown in soils similar to the type of soils modern seed plants are grown in. The taxa of progymnosperm trunk fossils reproduced by spores. For reproduction, they were more dependent on moisture than modern seed plants. Comparing the Wattieza, from New York Devonian paleosols, and the Callixylon's ecotones to show this dependency on moisture it shows that the Wattieza lived in an ecotone of 571 ± 72 mm mean annual precipitation and the Callixylon lived in an ecotone of 611 ± 46 mean annual precipitation. Because the Callixylon grew taller than the Wattieza it is inferred it was because there was more mean annual moisture available to the Callixylon.

In the lower Walton Formation, near Sidney, New York fossils of Archaeopteris macilenta, Callixylon zalesskyi, and Geminospora lemurata have been found. The tapering geometry of large woody root traces is the most likely cause of the intimate relationship between Argillic horizons, Alfisols, and forests. The large woody root traces can transport water and clay using their large pipes. They are efficient at moving soil into a subsurface horizon when the plant dies and the roots decay.

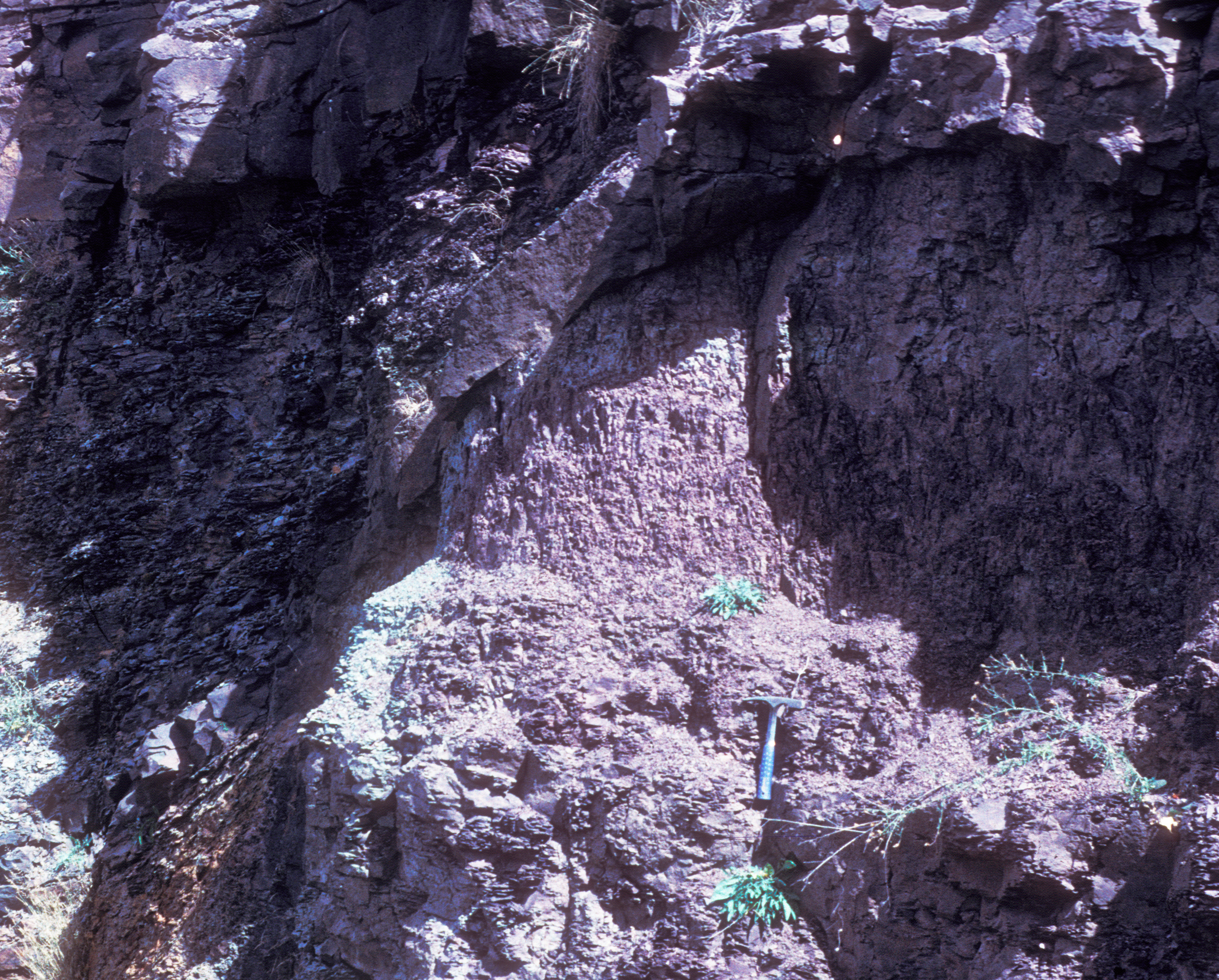
Alfisol paleosol cut by stream channel sandstone in Middle Devonian Oneonta Formation near East Windham, New York

The Mata Amarilla Formation, a formation in the Austral Basin in southern Patagonia, Argentina is the location known for the preservation of podocarp-dominated fossil forests. In the eastern area of the middle section of the Mata Amarilla Formation, there are vertic Alfisols. In these Alfisols, there is a preservation of fossil forests, whose minimum age is 337 years. The fossil forests in this section are made up of in situ trunks. These trunks, in life position, have shallow root systems with well-developed horizontal roots, and have minimal development of vertical roots. A log of Podocarpxylon gargiae roots was found in the formation as well. The total mean diameter of these trees in the vertic Alfisol paleosol is greater than 60 cm and the smallest tree diameter is 26 cm.

While Afisol paleosols are known for their woodland soils and fossils, other types of fossils have also been found. The ichnofacies of the ground-nesting bees, Celliforma, was formed in well drained Alfisols as well as Aridisols and Oxisols. The Termitichnus ichnofacies, which included a large array of termite nests and pellets, is found in Oligocene Alfisols, Aridisols, and Oxisols. All the tetrapod bones and tracks from the paleosol sequences of Late Devonian and Mississippian of New York and Pennsylvania, U.S.A. are found in Aridisols and Alfisols. The Alfisols in the Texas High Plains have evidence for fossilized pollen and beetles.

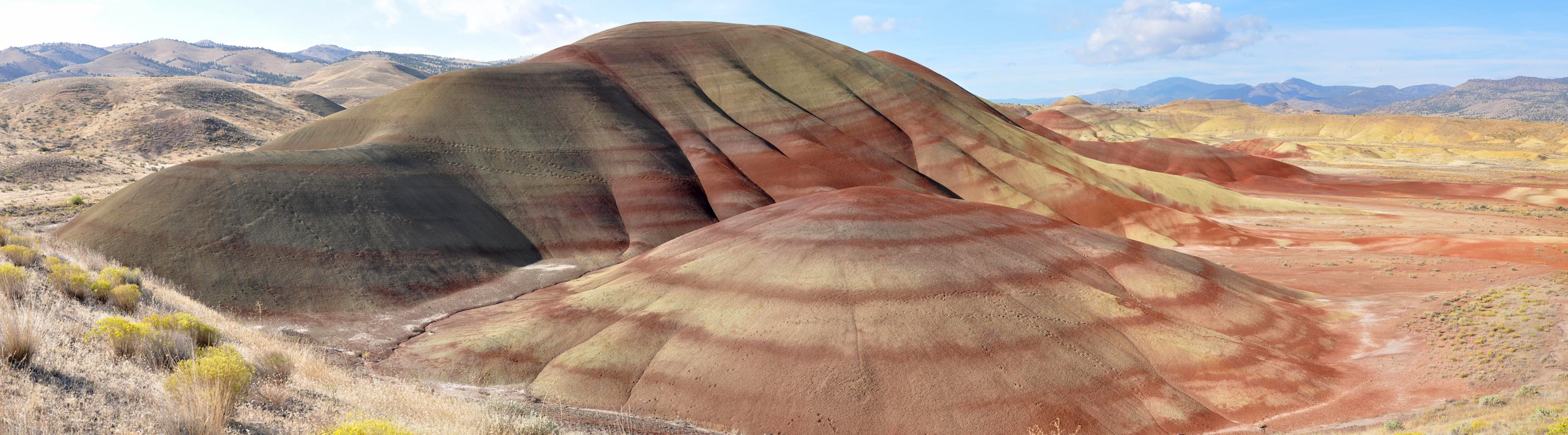
Multicolored rock strata in shades of red and yellow comprise a set of low, bare, rounded hills

== See also ==
- Paleosol
- Paleopedology
- Pedogenesis
- Pedology (soil study)
- Soil classification
- Soil science
- Soil type
