= Soil Science Society of Poland =

Polish scientific and professional society

The Soil Science Society of Poland (SSSP) (Polish: Polskie Towarzystwo Gleboznawcze) is a scientific and professional society of Polish soil scientists.

The society was founded in 1937 on the initiative of Feliks Terlikowski, Jan Włodek and Tadeusz Mieczyński. The aim of SSSP is to promote and stimulate the development of soil science, pedology, agricultural chemistry and agricultural microbiology in Poland and organize the community of Polish soil scientists. in 2017 the society gathers c. 450 members organized in 14 regional divisions and 4 thematic divisions (1. Soils in Space and Time, 2. Soil Properties and Processes, 3. Soil Use, 4. The Role of Soils in Sustaining Society and the Environment).

Soil Science Society of Poland is a member of the International Union of Soil Sciences (IUSS) and cooperate with European Geosciences Union (EGU), German Society of Soil Science, Dokuchajev Society of Soil Science, Lithuanian Society of Soil Science, Ukraine Soil Science Society, Soil Science Society of America, Soil Science Society of Turkey and various Polish environmental, scientific organizations.

The Society is a publisher of scientific magazine Soil Science Annual (former Roczniki Gleboznawcze, founded in 1950) with articles in English about broadly understood soil sciences. It is also initiator and publisher of subsequent editions of Polish Soil Classification.
