= Inceptisol =

Young, poorly developed soils

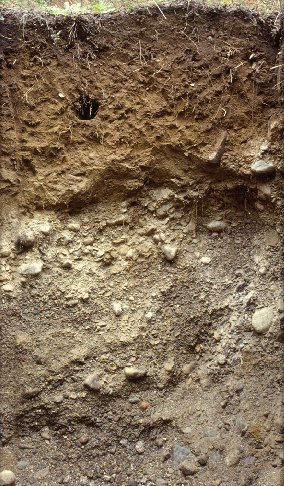
- Inceptisol profile
- Used in: USDA soil taxonomy

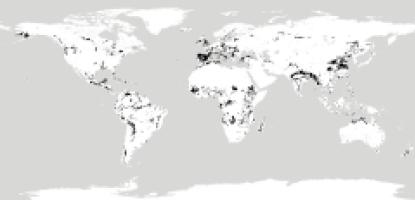
Inceptisols of the world

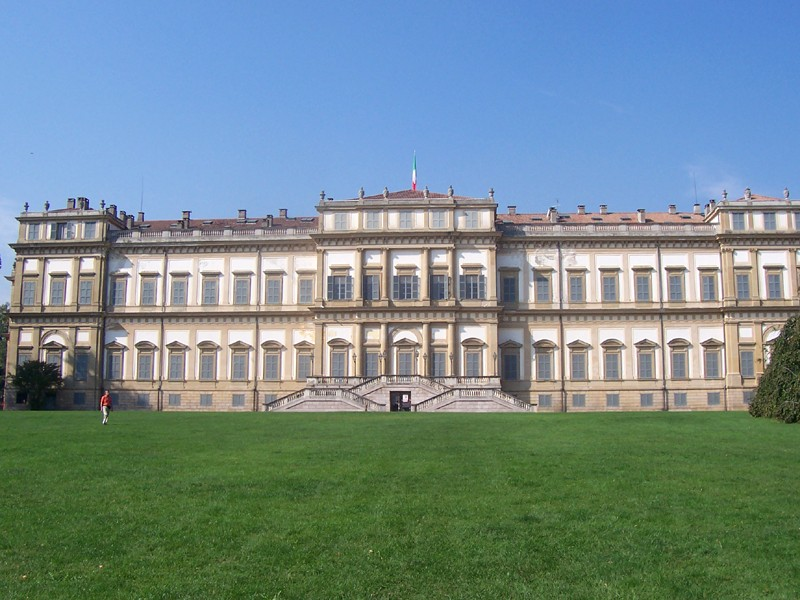
Some soils in urban environments fall into the Inceptisol order (soil suborder Anthrept)

Inceptisols are a soil order in USDA soil taxonomy. Inceptisols are young, meaning they have little to moderate development and weathering, but are more developed than Entisols. Soils that don't fall into any of the other classifications may default to being classified as an inceptisol. Inceptisol profiles can vary greatly in their epipedons, horizons, and subsoil horizons, but usually have an ochric or umbric epipedon with a cambic subsoil horizon. Other inceptisol profiles may or may not include a histic or plaggen epipedon, a calcic or petrocalcic horizon, and a duripan or fragipan layer.

== Occurrence ==
Inceptisols are found in a diverse array of environments, with the exception of extremes such as deserts and permafrost landscapes. Inceptisols are commonly found in rocky or mountainous areas, and sand dunes. They may also form in places with coastal, marine, and riverine deposition of sediments. The increased erosional activity of these areas can uncover an old surface where new sediments are deposited. Inceptisols can also be formed from late Pleistocene glacial drift. Due to the variation of conditions and parent material in which inceptisols can form, it's difficult to have a specific definition of the properties of this soil.

Suborders of inceptisols are classified by temperature, moisture, saturation, and the type of epipedon. Other defining characteristics may be from the presence and amount of sodium, soluble salts, and bioturbation from soil organisms. Depending on the suborder, the land could sustain agriculture, forests, and/or grasslands.

== Suborders ==
- Aquepts – Has a water table close to the surface or at the surface. Can have redoximorphic features
- Anthrepts – Has a plaggen or anthropic epipedon, a sign of intense and prolonged human activity
- Gelepts – Found in very cold climates with no permafrost
- Cryepts – Found in cold climates and high elevations
- Udepts – Found in humid climates with decent to high precipitation
- Ustepts – Found in semiarid and sub-humid climates that are moderately dry. Tend to be grasslands and get moisture from parts of the summer or growing season
- Xerepts – Found in areas with dry summers and moist winters. Moisture is moved and stored in the soil during the winter

== Cultivation ==
Due to the diversity in properties of inceptisols, they can be used to grow a variety of crops, however some may need additional management. Farming on inceptisols suborders such as ustepts and xerepts may not be recommended as the rainfall in the areas they occur may not be sufficient and may require extra investment from the farmer to ensure the crops are watered well. Farming on aquepts may require installing drainage pipes to lower the water table, allowing for aeration of the soil. However, drainage is not recommended in aquepts with a sulfuric horizon as it can create sulfuric acid, ruining the land if it's not managed properly.

== See also ==
- Soil formation
- Pedology
- Soil classification
- Soil science
