= Histosol =

Soil consisting primarily of organic materials

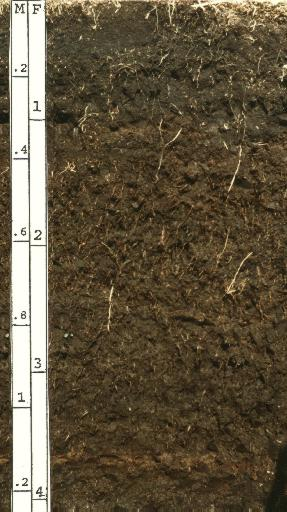
- A Histosol profile
- Used in: WRB, USDA soil taxonomy, other
- WRB code: HS
- Profile: OC
- Parent material: Organic matter
- Climate: subarctic, other

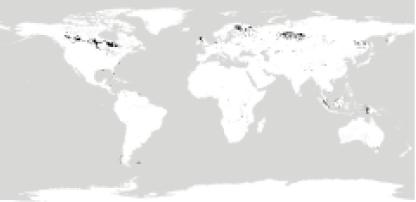
Histosols of the world

In both the World Reference Base for Soil Resources (WRB) and the USDA soil taxonomy, a Histosol is a soil consisting primarily of organic materials. They are defined as having 40 centimetres (16 in) or more of organic soil material starting within 40 cm from the soil surface. In Soil Taxonomy, Gelisols key out before Histosols, and in WRB, Histosols key out before Cryosols. Therefore, organic permafrost soils belong to the Histosols in WRB (Cryic Histosols) and to the Gelisols (Histels) in Soil Taxonomy.

Organic soil material has an organic carbon content (by weight) of 12 percent or more (Soil Taxonomy) or 20 percent or more (WRB). These materials include muck (sapric soil material), mucky peat (hemic soil material), or peat (fibric soil material). Many Histosols show aquic conditions or artificial drainage, some (Folists in Soil Taxonomy and Folic Histosols in WRB) developed under terrestrial conditions. Organic material and therefore Histosols have very low bulk density. Many are acidic and very deficient in major plant nutrients, especially the raised bogs, which are saturated by rainwater and lack connection to nutrient-containing groundwater.

Histosols are known by various other names in other countries, such as peat or muck. In the Australian Soil Classification, Histosols are called Organosols.

Histosols form whenever organic matter forms at a more rapid rate than it is destroyed. This occurs because of restricted drainage precluding aerobic decomposition, and the remains of plants and animals remain within the soil. Thus, Histosols are very important ecologically because they, and Gelisols, store large quantities of organic carbon. If accumulation continues for a long enough period, coal forms.

Most Histosols occur in Canada, Scandinavia, the West Siberian Plain, Sumatra, Borneo and New Guinea. Smaller areas are found in other parts of Europe, the Russian Far East (chiefly in Khabarovsk Krai and Amur Oblast), Florida and other areas of permanent swampland. Fossil Histosols are known from the earliest extensive land vegetation in the Devonian.

Histosols are generally very difficult to cultivate because of the poor drainage and often low chemical fertility. However, Histosols formed on very recent glacial lands can often be very productive when drained and produce high-grade pasture for dairying or beef cattle. They can sometimes be used for fruit if carefully managed, but there is a great risk of the organic matter becoming dry powder and eroding under the influence of drying winds. A tendency towards shrinkage and compaction is also evident with crops.

Like Gelisols, Histosols have greatly restricted use for civil engineering purposes because heavy structures tend to subside in the wet soil.

In USDA soil taxonomy, Histosols are subdivided into:

- Folists – Histosols that are not saturated with water for long periods of time during the year.
- Fibrists – Histosols that are primarily made up of only slightly decomposed organic materials, often called peat.
- Hemists – Histosols that are primarily made up of moderately decomposed organic materials.
- Saprists – Histosols that are primarily made up of highly decomposed organic materials, often called muck.
- Wassists - Histosols that have a field observable water table 2 cm or more above the soil surface for more than 21 hours of each day in all years.

== Taxonomy. Principal qualifiers ==
Histosols are classified into:

- Muusic/ Rockic/ Mawic
- Cryic
- Thionic
- Folic
- Floatic/ Subaquatic/ Tidalic
- Fibric/ Hemic/ Sapric
- Leptic
- Murshic/ Drainic
- Ombric/ Rheic
- Hyperskeletic/ Skeletic
- Andic
- Vitric
- Calcic
- Dystric/ Eutric

== See also ==
- Acid sulfate soil
- Hydric soil
- Pedogenesis
- Pedology (soil study)
- Soil classification
- Soil type
