= USDA soil taxonomy =

Classification of soil types

USDA soil taxonomy (ST), developed by the United States Department of Agriculture and the National Cooperative Soil Survey, provides an elaborate classification of soil types according to several parameters (most commonly their properties) and in several levels: Order, Suborder, Great Group, Subgroup, Family, and Series. The classification was originally developed by Guy Donald Smith, former director of the U.S. Department of Agriculture's soil survey investigations.

== Discussion ==
A taxonomy is an arrangement in a systematic manner; the USDA soil taxonomy has six levels of classification. They are, from most general to specific: order, suborder, great group, subgroup, family and series. Soil properties that can be measured quantitatively are used in this classification system – they include: depth, moisture, temperature, texture, structure, cation exchange capacity, base saturation, clay mineralogy, organic matter content and salt content. There are 12 soil orders (the top hierarchical level) in soil taxonomy. The names of the orders end with the suffix -sol. The criteria for the different soil orders include properties that reflect major differences in the genesis of soils. The orders are:

- Alfisol – soils with aluminium and iron. They have horizons of clay accumulation, and form where there is enough moisture and warmth for at least three months of plant growth. They constitute 10% of soils worldwide.
- Andisol – volcanic ash soils. They are young soils. They cover 1% of the world's ice-free surface.
- Aridisol – dry soils forming under desert conditions which have fewer than 90 consecutive days of moisture during the growing season and are nonleached. They include nearly 12% of soils on Earth. Soil formation is slow, and accumulated organic matter is scarce. They may have subsurface zones of caliche or duripan. Many aridisols have well-developed Bt horizons showing clay movement from past periods of greater moisture.
- Entisol – recently formed soils that lack well-developed horizons. Commonly found on unconsolidated river and beach sediments of sand and clay or volcanic ash, some have an A horizon on top of bedrock. They are 18% of soils worldwide.
- Gelisol – permafrost soils with permafrost within two metres of the surface or gelic materials and permafrost within one metre. They constitute 9% of soils worldwide.
- Histosol – organic soils, formerly called bog soils, are 1% of soils worldwide.
- Inceptisol – young soils. They have subsurface horizon formation but show little eluviation and illuviation. They constitute 15% of soils worldwide.
- Mollisol – soft, deep, dark soil formed in grasslands and some hardwood forests with very thick A horizons. They are 7% of soils worldwide.
- Oxisol – are heavily weathered, are rich in iron and aluminum oxides (sesquioxides) or kaolin but low in silica. They have only trace nutrients due to heavy tropical rainfall and high temperatures and low CEC of the remaining clays. They are 8% of soils worldwide.
- Spodosol – acid soils with organic colloid layer complexed with iron and aluminium leached from a layer above. They are typical soils of coniferous and deciduous forests in cooler climates. They constitute 4% of soils worldwide.
- Ultisol – acid soils in the humid tropics and subtropics, which are depleted in calcium, magnesium and potassium (important plant nutrients). They are highly weathered, but not as weathered as Oxisols. They make up 8% of the soil worldwide.
- Vertisol – inverted soils. They are clay-rich and tend to swell when wet and shrink upon drying, often forming deep cracks into which surface layers can fall. They are difficult to farm or to construct roads and buildings due to their high expansion rate. They constitute 2% of soils worldwide.
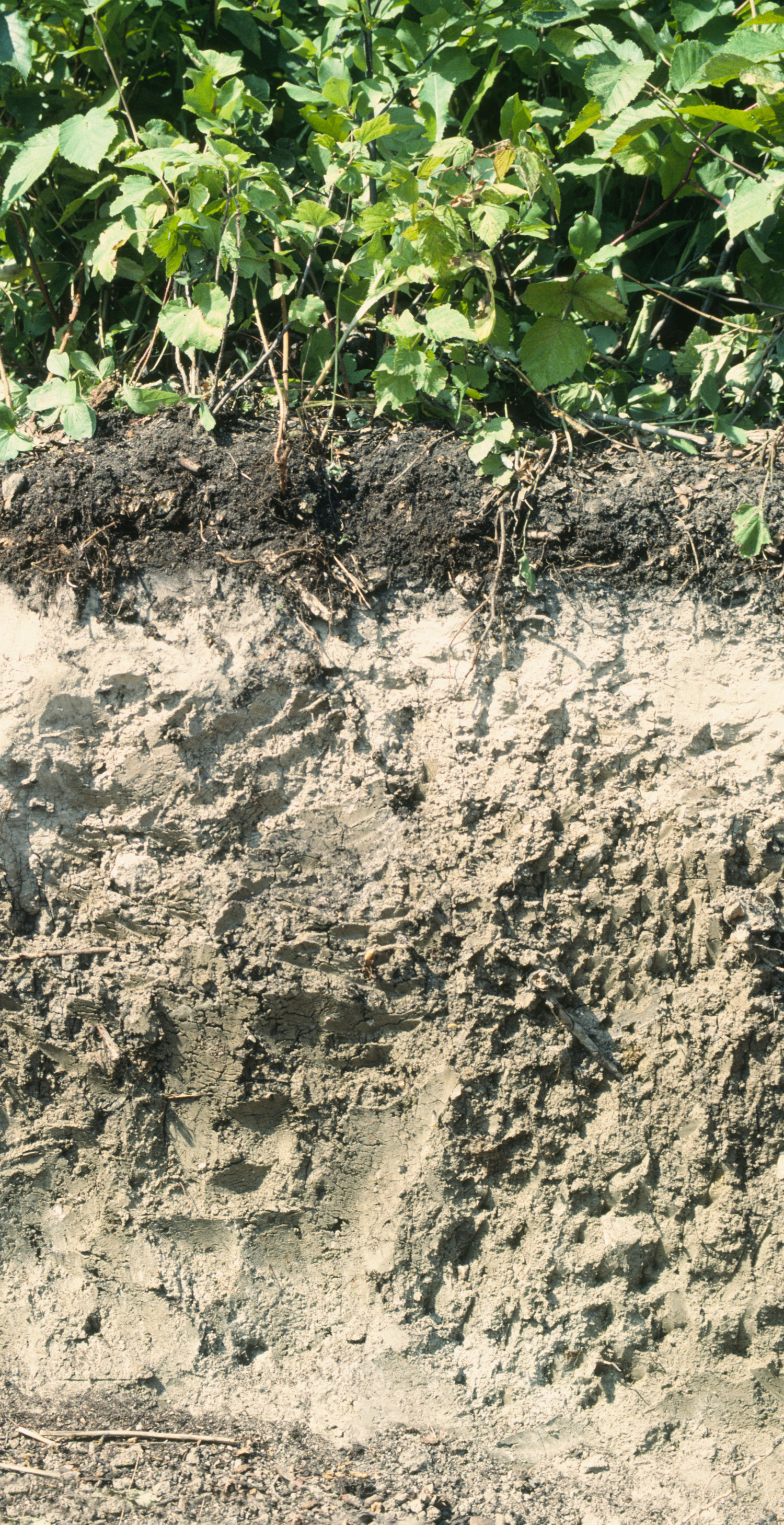
Alfisol

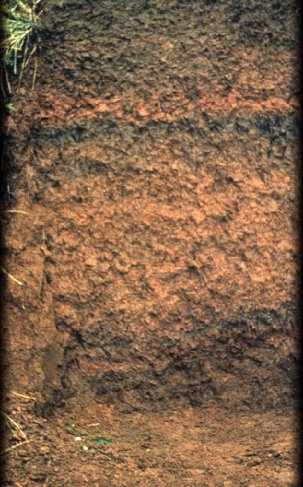
Andisol

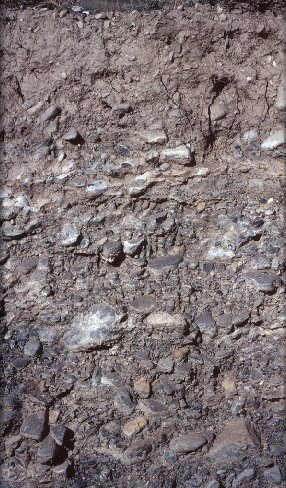
Aridisol

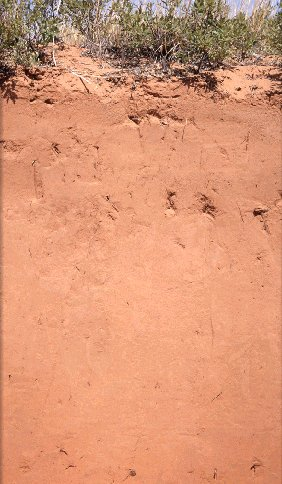
Entisol

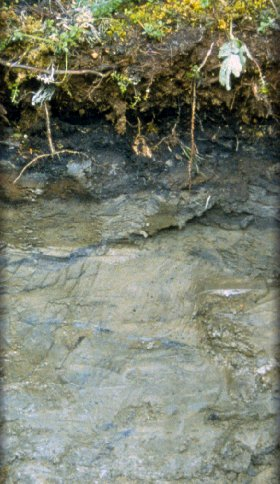
Gelisol

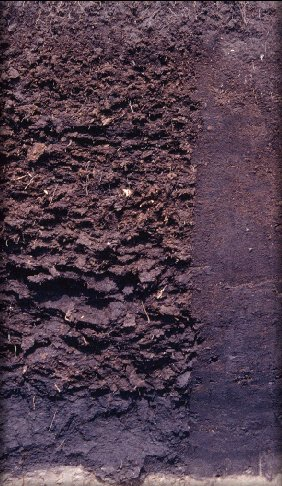
Histosol

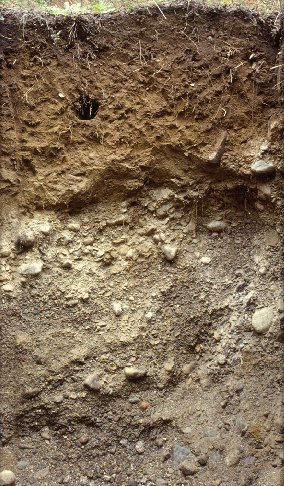
Inceptisol

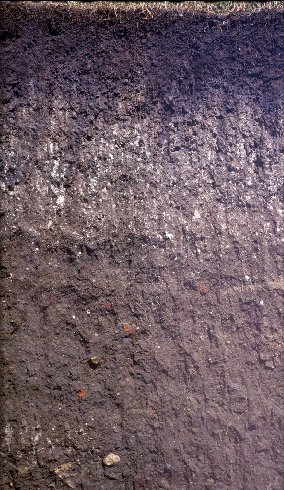
Mollisol

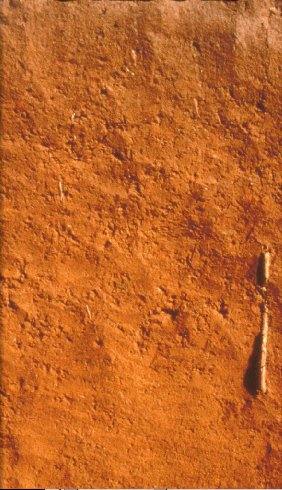
Oxisol

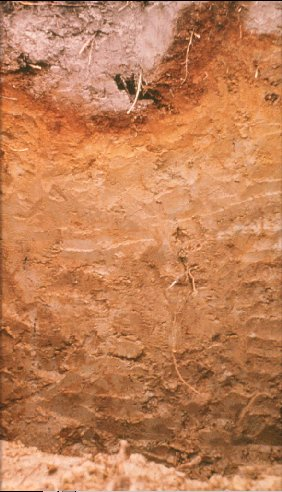
Spodosol

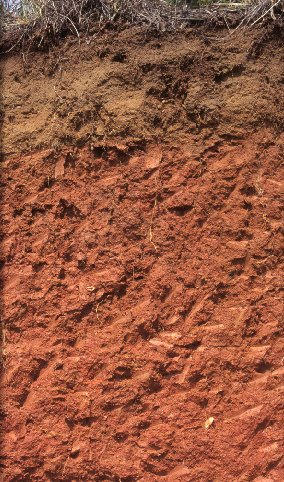
Ultisol

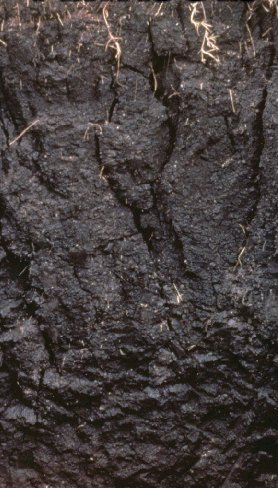
Vertisol

The percentages listed above are for land area free of ice. "Soils of Mountains", which constitute the balance (11.6%), have a mixture of those listed above, or are classified as "Rugged Mountains" which have no soil.

The above soil orders in sequence of increasing degree of development are Entisols, Inceptisols, Aridisols, Mollisols, Alfisols, Spodosols, Ultisols, and Oxisols. Histosols and Vertisols may appear in any of the above at any time during their development.

The soil suborders within an order are differentiated on the basis of soil properties and horizons which depend on soil moisture and temperature. Forty-seven suborders are recognized in the United States.

The soil great group category is a subdivision of a suborder in which the kind and sequence of soil horizons distinguish one soil from another. About 185 great groups are recognized in the United States. Horizons marked by clay, iron, humus and hard pans and soil features such as the expansion-contraction of clays (that produce self-mixing provided by clay), temperature, and marked quantities of various salts are used as distinguishing features.

The great group categories are divided into three kinds of soil subgroups: typic, intergrade and extragrade. A typic subgroup represents the basic or 'typical' concept of the great group to which the described subgroup belongs. An intergrade subgroup describes the properties that suggest how it grades towards (is similar to) soils of other soil great groups, suborders or orders. These properties are not developed or expressed well enough to cause the soil to be included within the great group towards which they grade, but suggest similarities. Extragrade features are aberrant properties which prevent that soil from being included in another soil classification. About 1,000 soil subgroups are defined in the United States.

A soil family category is a group of soils within a subgroup and describes the physical and chemical properties which affect the response of soil to agricultural management and engineering applications. The principal characteristics used to differentiate soil families include texture, mineralogy, pH, permeability, structure, consistency, the locale's precipitation pattern, and soil temperature. For some soils the criteria also specify the percentage of silt, sand and coarse fragments such as gravel, cobbles and rocks. About 4,500 soil families are recognised in the United States.

A family may contain several soil series which describe the physical location using the name of a prominent physical feature such as a river or town near where the soil sample was taken. An example would be Merrimac for the Merrimack River in New Hampshire. More than 14,000 soil series are recognised in the United States. This permits very specific descriptions of soils.

A soil phase of series, originally called 'soil type' describes the soil surface texture, slope, stoniness, saltiness, erosion, and other conditions.

== Soil orders ==
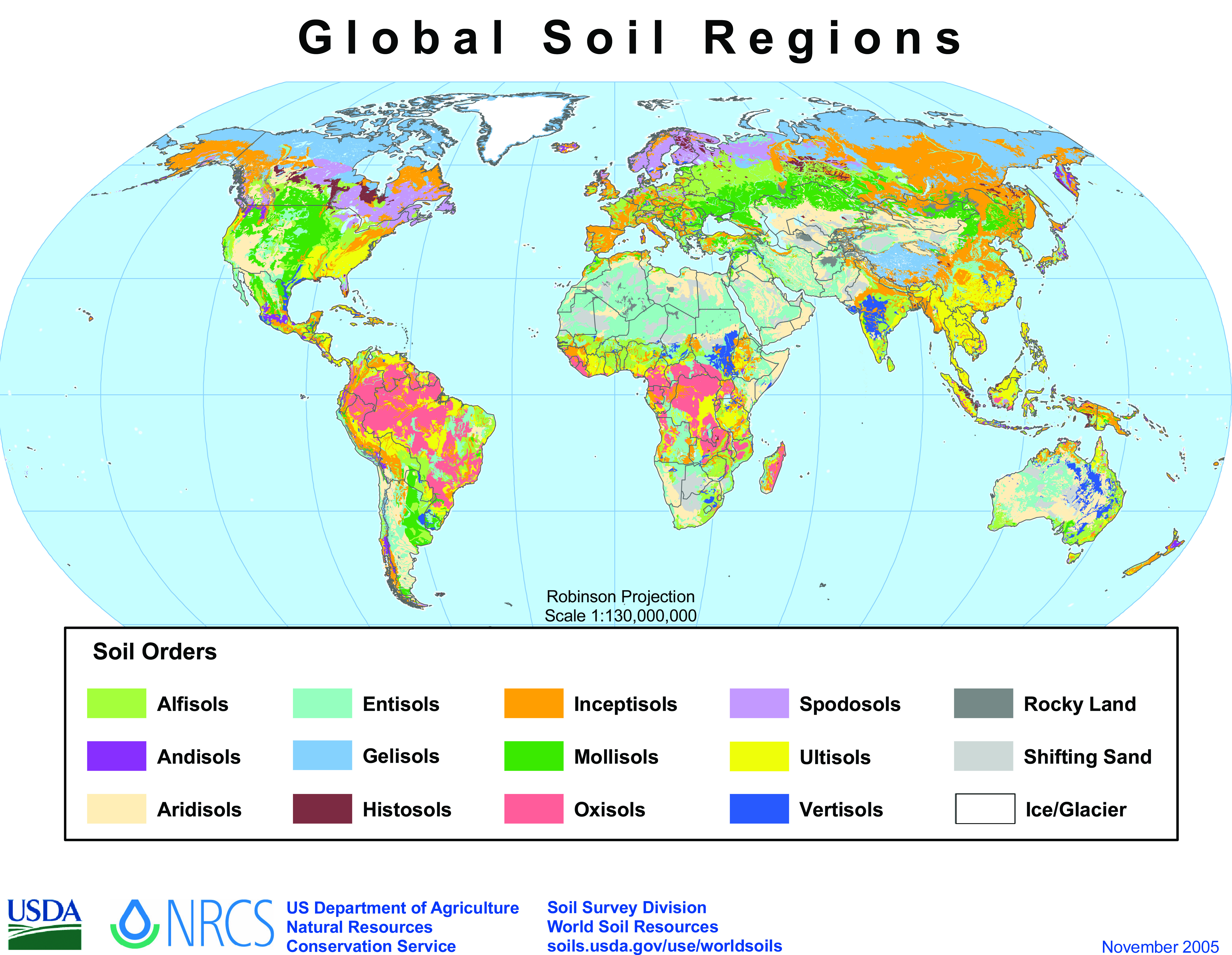
Global distribution of Soil Orders in the USDA soil taxonomy system. A much larger version of the map is also available.

Name of soil orders in soil taxonomy with their major characteristics:

- Alfisols: Must have argillic, natric, or kandic horizon; high-to-medium base saturation; moderately weathered; commonly form under boreal or broadleaf forests; rich in iron and aluminum; common in humid areas, semi-tropics, and mediterranean climates; 9.6% of global and 14.5% of U.S. ice-free land.
- Andisols: Form from volcanic ejecta, dominated by allophane or Al-humic complexes; Must have andic soil properties: high in poorly crystalline Fe and Al minerals, high in phosphorus, low bulk density, and high proportions of glass and amorphous colloidal materials, such as allophane, imogolite and ferrihydrite; high organic matter content, sometimes melanic epipedon; 0.7% of global and 1.7% of U.S. ice-free land.
- Aridisols: Dry soil (i.e., must have aridic moisture regime); ochric epipedon is common; Sometimes argillic or natric horizon; must have some diagnostic subsurface horizon; commonly in deserts; 12.7% of global and 8.8% of U.S. ice-free land.
- Entisols: Least soil profile development; ochric epipedon is common; no B horizons; most common order by surface area (16.3% of global and 12.2% of U.S. ice-free land).
- Gelisols: Soils with permafrost within 100 cm or cryoturbation (frost churning) within 100 cm plus permafrost within 200 cm; commonly at high latitudes and elevations; 8.6% of global and 7.5% of U.S. ice-free land.
- Histosols: Must have histic epipedon; usually aquic soil moisture regime; no diagnostic subsurface horizons; rapid decomposition when aerated; peat or bog; >20% organic matter; organic soil materials extending down to an impermeable layer or with an organic layer that is more than 40 cm thick and without andic properties; commonly in wetlands (swamps, marshes, etc.); 1.2% of global and 1.3% of U.S. ice-free land.
- Inceptisols: Similar to entisol, but beginning of a B horizon is evident; no diagnostic subsurface horizons; on landscapes continuously eroded or young deposits; cambic, sulfuric, calcic, gypsic, petrocalcic, or petrogypsic horizon, or with a mollic, umbric, or histic epipedon, or with an exchangeable sodium percentage of >15% or fragipan; 9.9% of global & 9.1% of U.S. ice-free land.
- Mollisols: Must have mollic epipedon; high base saturation of >50%; dark soils; some with argillic or natric horizons; common in grasslands; 6.9% of global and 22.4% of U.S. ice-free land.
- Oxisols: Most soil profile development; must have oxic horizon within 150 cm of soil surface; low nutrient availability; no argillic horizon; highly weathered; dominated by end-member clays, Al and Fe oxides; commonly in old landscapes in tropics; 7.6% of global and <0.01% of U.S. ice-free land.
- Spodosols: Must have spodic horizon within 2 m of soil surface and without andic properties; Usually have albic horizon; high in Fe, Al oxides and humus accumulation; acidic soils; common in coniferous or boreal forests; 2.6% of global and 3.3% of U.S. ice-free land.
- Ultisols: Must have argillic or kandic horizon; Low base saturation of <35% at 2 m depth or 75 cm below a fragipan; common in subtropical regions; often known as red clay soils; 8.5% of global & 9.6% of U.S. ice-free land.
- Vertisols: Usually mollic epipedon; high in shrinking and swelling clays; >30% clay to a depth of 50 cm; deep cracks (called gilgai) form when soil dries; form from parent material high in clay (e.g., shales, basins, exposed Bt horizons of old soils); 2.4% of global and 1.7% of U.S. ice-free land.

== Soil type classification examples ==
Order: Entisols

Suborder: Fluvents

Great Group: Torrifluvents

Subgroup: Typic Torrifluvents

Family: Fine-loamy, mixed, superactive, calcareous, Typic Torrifluvents

Series: Jocity, Youngston.

Order: Alfisols

Suborder: Xeralfs

Great Group: Durixeralfs

Subgroup: Abruptic Durixeralfs

Family: Fine, Mixed, Active, thermic Abruptic Durixeralfs

Series: San Joaquin (soil)

== Soil temperature regimes ==
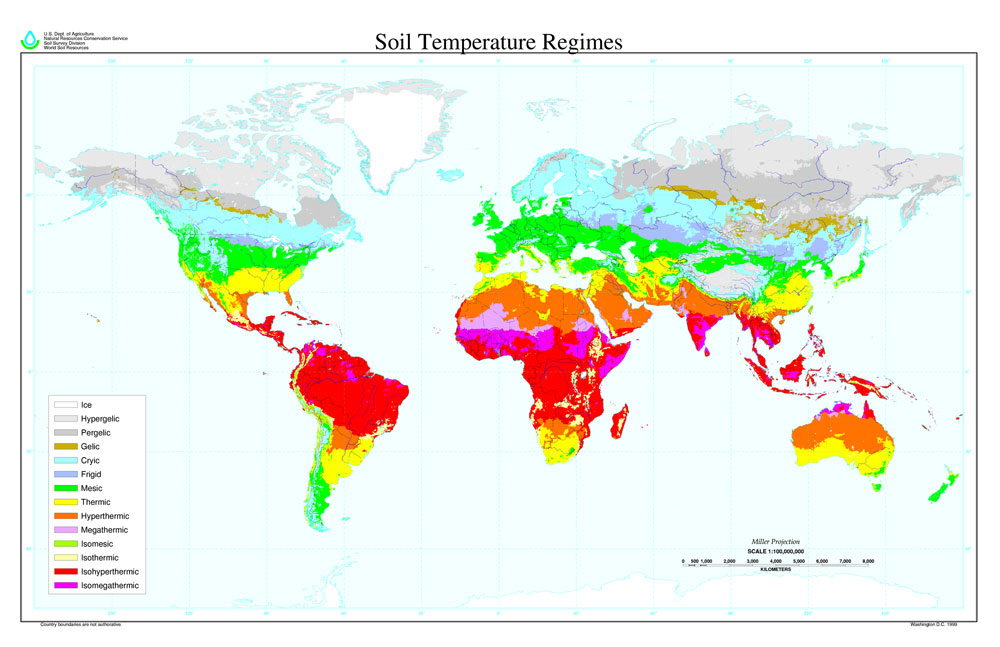
Global distribution of soil temperature regimes

Soil temperature regimes, such as frigid, mesic, and thermic, are used to classify soils at some of the lower levels of the Soil Taxonomy. The cryic temperature regime distinguishes some higher-level groups. These regimes are based on the mean annual soil temperature (MAST), mean summer temperature, and the difference between mean summer and winter temperatures all at a soil depth of 50 cm. It is normally assumed that the MAST (in °C) equals the sum of the mean annual air temperature plus 2 °C. If the difference between mean summer and winter temperatures is less than 6 °C, then add "Iso" at the front of the name of the Soil Temperature Class.

Soil temperature regime	Temperature range
Pergelic	~ -8 °C to -4 °C
Subgelic	~ -4 °C to 0 °C
Frigid	~ 0 °C to 8 °C
Mesic	8 °C to 15 °C
Thermic	15 °C to 22 °C
Hyperthermic	22 °C or higher

== Soil moisture regimes ==
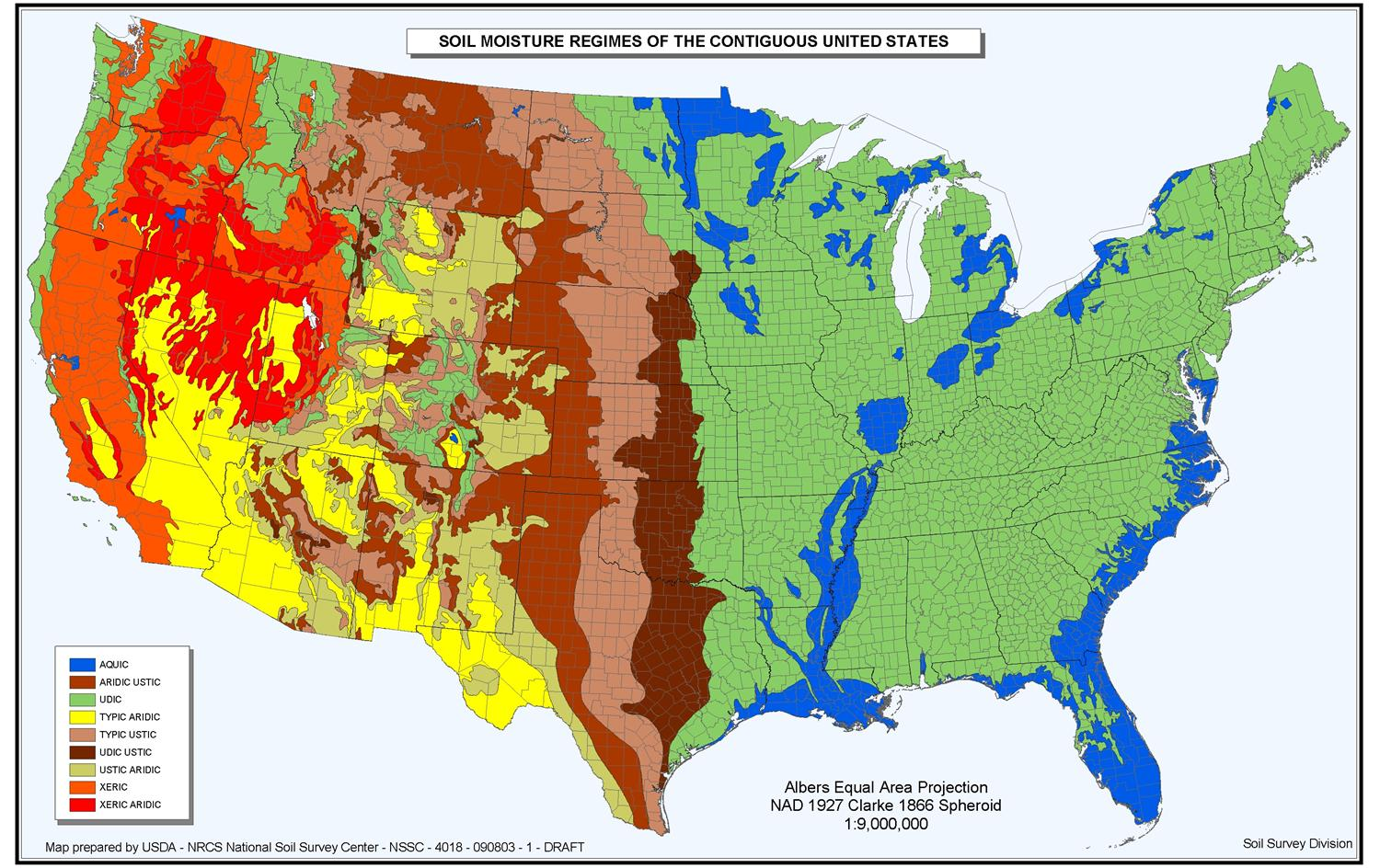
United States distribution of soil moisture regimes

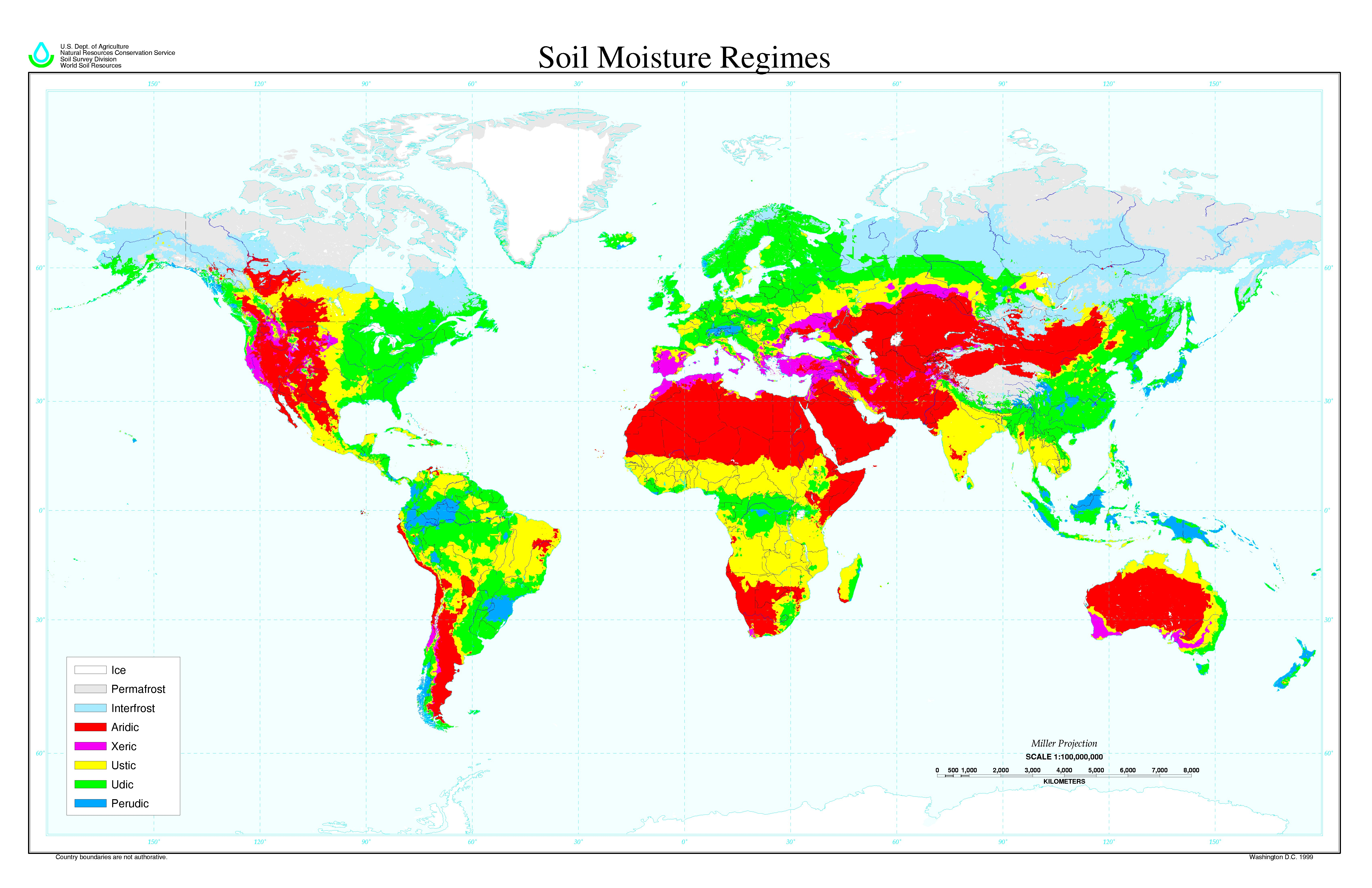
Global distribution of soil moisture regimes

The soil moisture regime, often reflective of climatic factors, is a major determinant of the productivity of terrestrial ecosystems, including agricultural systems. The soil moisture regimes are defined based on the levels of the groundwater table and the amounts of soil water available to plants during a given year in a particular region. Several moisture regime classes are used to characterize soils. These categories are terminology modifiers at the soil suborder level of characterization.

Soil Moisture Regime	Major Characteristics
Aquic	Soil is saturated with water and virtually free of gaseous oxygen for sufficient periods of time, such that there is evidence of poor aeration (gleying and mottling); common in wetlands.
Udic	Soil moisture is sufficiently high year-round in most years to meet plant requirement; common in humid regions.
Ustic	Soil moisture is intermediate between Udic and Aridic regimes; generally, plant-available moisture during the growing season, but severe periods of drought may occur; common in semi-arid regions.
Aridic	Soil is dry for at least half of the growing season and moist for less than 90 consecutive days; common in arid (desert-like) regions.
Xeric	Soil moisture regime is found in Mediterranean-type climates, with cool, moist winters and warm, dry summers. Like the Ustic Regime, it is characterized as having long periods of drought in the summer.

== See also ==
- 1938 USDA soil taxonomy
- FAO soil classification
- International Committee on Anthropogenic Soils (ICOMANTH)
- Soil
- Soil classification
- Soil horizon
- Soil in the United States
- World Reference Base for Soil Resources

== Bibliography ==
- Donahue, Roy Luther; Miller, Raymond W.; Shickluna, John C. (1977). Soils: An Introduction to Soils and Plant Growth. Prentice-Hall. ISBN 978-0-13-821918-5.
