= Llanquihue glaciation =

Last glacial period in southern Chile

View of the Chilean Lake District where the Llanquihue glaciation has been defined.

The last glacial period and its associated glaciation is known in southern Chile as the Llanquihue glaciation (Spanish: Glaciación de Llanquihue). Its area lies west of Llanquihue Lake where various drifts or end moraine systems belonging to the last glacial period have been identified. (Note: Previously in the 1930s Carl Caldenius had named the last glacial period in South America "Finiglacial" after an existing scheme in Nordic countries.) The glaciation is of the last formations in the Patagonian Ice Sheet. Around Nahuel Huapi Lake the equivalent glaciation is known as the Nahuel Huapi Drift.

The preceding interglacial is known as the Valdivia interglacial after its type locality of Valdivia.

== General characteristics ==
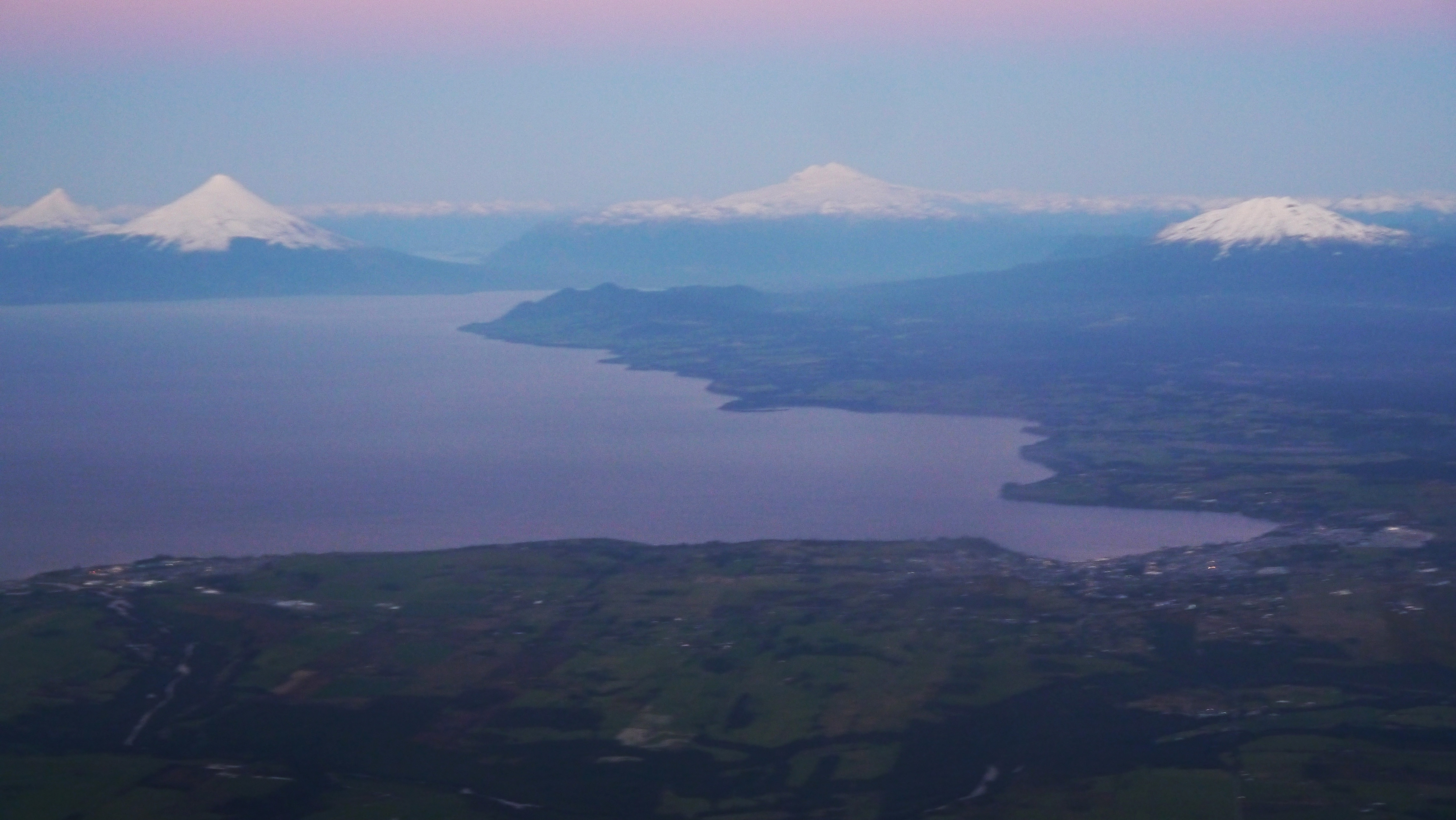
View of Llanquihue Lake. During much of the Llanquihue glaciations glaciers flowing from the Andes in the east (background) coalesced and entered the lake basin forming a large glacier lobe there.

The characteristics of the glaciation change according to its latitude. In Central Chile, south of Atacama Desert, the extent of the Llanquihue glaciation was controlled by rain which increases to the southern parts of Chille. The height of the glaciers advances were not the same across the affected area, as they were triggered by north and southward shifts in the moisture-bringing Westerlies and its storm tracks. Glaciers in Central Chile were particularly sensitive to shifts in the precipitation pattern and those to the south in southern Chile (39–43° S) were sensitive to both precipitation and temperature, correlating better with global temperature trends.

During large glacier advances the Llanquihue glaciation in Chile showed a marked difference north and south of latitude 41.5° S. To the south Andean valley glacier lobes coalesced and spread out occupying what is today the sea of Chiloé and other marine basins. At times the ice reached all the way across to the foot of the Chilean Coast Range in Chiloé. This meant that the region south of 41.5° S was subject to a proper ice sheet glaciation during large glacier advances. In contrast during times of glacier advance Andean valley glaciers entering the Chilean Central Valley in the Chilean Lake District (39–41.5° S) spread out forming large but separate glacier lobes, meaning that the glaciation remained restricted by topography being a glaciation of valley glaciers, or in other words one of Alpine type.

In the Chilean Lake District and Chiloé large outwash plains formed during the Llanquihue glaciation occupies positions between Llanquihue moraines and moraines of the older Santa María glaciation. At present these outwashs contain a distinctive ñadi type soil and vegetation.

In the Atacama Desert high mountains (>5000) have remained ice-free through the whole Quaternary period. Similarly the dry areas east of the Andes in Patagonia were not glaciated but developed periglacial features like ice wedges, patterned ground, pingos, rock glaciers, palsas, soil cryoturbation, solifluction deposits during the Llanquihue glaciation. (Note: However, not all of the reported features have been verified.)

The coast of Chile north of 42° S and most of the Chilean Coast Range remained glacier-free and parts of it also free from periglaciation though the glaciation. Yet, small glaciers existed in the highest part of the Chilean Coast Range. Above altitudes of 100 m (Cordillera Piuchén) or 600 m (Cordillera de Nahuelbuta) soils in the Chilean Coast Range were disturbed by solifluction (a periglacial process). Between 41 and 37° S, the coastal region, the lower slopes of the Chilean Coast Range, and the westernmost Chilean Central Valley remained free of disturbance by the glacial, glacifluvial and periglacial meaning these regions (in particular around Cordillera de Nahuelbuta) served as refugia for Valdivian temperate rainforest. According to Carolina Villagrán the low diversity of bryophytes in Aysén Region when compared to neighboring regions would have been the result of the Llanquihue glaciation covering almost the total of it, leaving little or no space for refugua.

== Development of the glaciation ==
Palynological analysis in Chiloé reveal the existence of at least three warm periods, or interstadials, during the Llanquihue glaciation. One interstadial begun 57,000 years before present (yrs BP) and ended no later than 49.000 yrs BP, another that begun 50,000 yrs BP and ended no later than 47,000 yrs BP and a third one from 45,000 to 35,000 yrs BP. During the interstadials of the glaciation the conifers Fitzroya and Pilgerodendron had much greater geographical extent than at present growing during that time in the Chilean Central Valley at latitudes between 41° and 43° S. Between 30 and 40° S glaciers reached their maximum advance about 40 to 35 ka BP, exceeding any extent they had during the global Last Glacial Maximum. Compared to the Llanquihue and Chiloé area maximum glacier advance was achieved much earlier in Torres del Paine and Última Esperanza Sound (51-52° S) where glaciation peaked about 48,000 years ago.

There is evidence for five westward advances of glacier lobes in the southern Chilean Lake District and Chiloé (40–42.5° S). These advances occurred at ~33,600, ~30,800, ~26,900, ~26,000 and 17,700–18,100 years before present.

=== Last Glacial Maximum ===
During the Last Glacial Maximum valley glaciers merged and descended from the Andes occupying lacustrine and marine basins where they spread out forming large piedmont glacier lobes. Glaciers extended about 7 km west of the modern Llanquihue Lake but not more than 2 to 3 km south of it. Nahuel Huapi Lake in Argentina was also glaciated by the same time. In the city of Bariloche, at the shore of Nahuel Huapi Lake, a Late Glacial till has been interpreted to indicate it formed in a glaciokarst environment. Over most Chiloé glacier advance peaked in 26,000 yrs BP forming a long north–south moraine system along the eastern coast of Chiloé Island. Even between neighboring glacier lobes maximum glacier extent was not synchronous; as the glacier occupying the Puyhue basin (40°41' S) was retreating calving at a proglacial Puyehue Lake the glacier at Rupanco basin (40°49' S) was at its maximum extent.

Despite glacier advances much of the area west of Llanquihue Lake was still ice-free during the Last Glacial Maximum. During the coldest period of the Last Glacial Maximum vegetation at this location was dominated by Alpine herbs in wide open surfaces. The global warming that followed caused a slow change in vegetation towards a sparsely distributed vegetation dominated by Nothofagus species. Within this parkland vegetation Magellanic moorland alternated with Nothofagus forest, and as warming progressed even warm-climate trees begun to grow in the area. It is estimated that the tree line was depressed about 1000 m relative to present day elevations during the coldest period, but it rose gradually until 19,300 yr BP. At that time a cold reversal caused a replacement of much of the arboreal vegetation with Magellanic moorland and Alpine species.

Little is known about the extent of glaciers during Last Glacial Maximum north of the Chilean Lake District. To the north, in the dry Andes of Central and the Last Glacial Maximum is associated with increased humidity and the verified advance of at least some mountain glaciers.

A study of the cushion grass Oreobolus obtusangulus suggest that this plant survived glaciation in three glacial refugia; these being south-central Chile, the eastern Patagonian Andes and eastern Tierra del Fuego.

=== Deglaciation ===
Rapid warming started 17,800 years before present leading to interglacial temperatures within 1000 years accompanied by the retreat of glaciers and the rapid colonization of Nothofagus dombeyi and the subsequent development of Valdivian temperate rainforest in the formerly glaciated area. Magellanic moorland species that had thrived in unglaciated areas during the 19,300–17,800 ka BP cold interval were largely wiped out as conditions changed from hyper-humid to humid. The deglaciation pulse that begun in 17,800 was paralleled by similar events in New Zealand.

After the general Late Glacial Maximum a new pulse of glacier advance occurred about 14,850 ka BP. At this point the Golfo Corcovado lobe (ca. 43° S) exceeded any extent it had in the last 30,000 ka BP. Other lobes advanced inside the limits of their earlier Late Glacial Maximum extent. Deglaciation was almost complete after ice-lobes collapsed rapidly after 14,000 ka BP. The Magellanic moorland vegetation around Llanquihue Lake was replaced by North Patagonian Rain Forest including Myrtaceae, Nothofagus dombeyi, Fitzroya cupressoides and Lomatia. Further warming is thought to have caused conifer forest, including Fitzroya cupressoides, to lose ground to other vegetation types over much of the lowlands and obtaining its modern discontinuous distribution in the cool heights of the Chilean Coast Range and the Andes.

As glaciers retreated the volcanoes of the Southern Volcanic Zone in the Chilean Lake District underwent transition from high production rates of volcanic ash and pyroclasts from explosive eruptions to a period of lower ash and pyroclast production associated with a change in magma type from felsic to mafic. Subsequently, felsic magmatism and explosive eruption resumed. All of this has been thought to be linked to changes in the stress field of the volcanoes and their plumbing system caused by unloading of ice. As deglaciation proceeded faster in the north there is an apparent lag in the onset of this behavior among volcanoes. The period of less explosive volcanism spanned from about 17–4 ka BP in Villarrica (39°25' S), 10–2 ka BP in Mocho-Choshuenco (39°55' S), 6–2 ka BP in Puyehue-Cordón Caulle (40°35' S) and Calbuco (41°20' S).

Various ephemeral proglacial lakes existed during the deglaciation including Castro Lake in central Chiloé Island and Paleolake Tehuelche in Torres del Paine (51° S).
