= Andosol =

Soils formed in volcanic ash and containing glass and amorphous colloidal materials

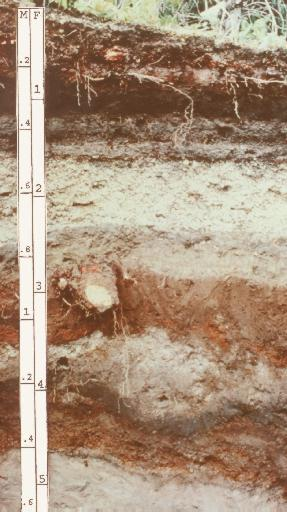
- An Andosol profile
- Used in: WRB
- WRB code: AN
- Profile: Ah-Bwβ-Cγ
- Parent material: tephra
- Climate: various

Andosols are soils found in volcanic areas formed in volcanic tephra. In some cases, andosols can also be found outside active volcanic areas. Andosols cover an estimated 1–2% of Earth's ice-free land surface. Andosols are a Reference Soil Group of the World Reference Base for Soil Resources (WRB). They are closely related to other types of soils such as Vitrosols, Vitrandosols, Vitrons and Pumice Soils that are used in different soil classification systems. The name comes from Japanese an (暗 'dark') and do (土 'soil'), synonymous with kuroboku (黒ぼく). In the USDA soil taxonomy (ST), many Andosols belong to the order of the Andisols. However, the definitions are different. Some Histosols (WRB) belong to the Andisols (ST), and some Andosols (WRB) belong to the Inceptisols (ST).

Andosols typically develop in parent materials containing high proportions of glass. If significant amounts of glasses are still present, they show vitric properties and receive the Vitric qualifier. With advanced weathering of the glasses, they show andic properties. There are two possibilities of soil formation. In more acidic tephras in humid climates, complexes of organic matter with Al ions develop, and the Andosols are characterized by the Aluandic qualifier. If the tephras are more basic or the climate is dry, amorphous colloidal materials, including allophane and imogolite, develop, and the Andosols are given the Silandic qualifier. In both cases, they contain many ferrihydrite and have a bulk density ≤ 0.9 kg/dm^{3}. Silandic Andosols are very fertile except in cases where phosphorus is easily fixed (as sometimes occurs in the tropics). They can usually support intensive cropping, with areas used for wet rice in Java supporting some of the densest populations in the world. Other Andosol areas support crops of fruit, maize, tea, coffee, or tobacco. In the Pacific Northwest USA, Andosols support very productive forests.

Andosols occupy ~1-2% of global ice-free land area. Most occur around the Pacific Ring of Fire, with the largest areas found in central Chile, Ecuador, Colombia, Mexico, the Pacific Northwest US, Japan, Java and New Zealand's North Island. Other areas occur in the East African Rift, Italy, Iceland and Hawaiʻi. They are the most common type of soil in the Azores.

Fossil andosols are known from areas far from present-day volcanic activity and have in some cases been dated as far back as the Precambrian 1.5 billion years ago.

== Important qualifiers ==
- Vitric – Andosols with limited soil formation, still containing significant amounts of volcanic glasses.
- Aluandic – Andosols with advanced soil formation containing many complexes of organic substances and aluminium.
- Silandic – Andosols with advanced soil formation containing many allophanes and imogolites.

== See also ==
- Pedogenesis
- Pedology (soil study)
- Soil classification
- Trumao
