= Andisol =

Soils formed in volcanic ash and containing glass and amorphous colloidal materials

- Andosol
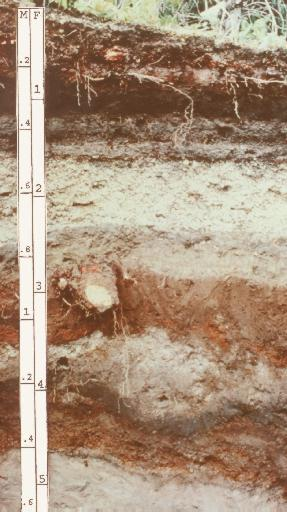
- An andisol profile
- Used in: USDA soil taxonomy, World Reference Base for Soil Resources
- Profile: ABwC
- Parent material: tephra

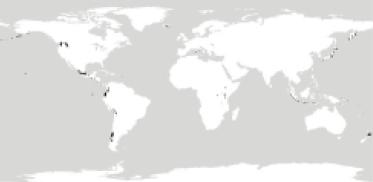
Andisols of the world

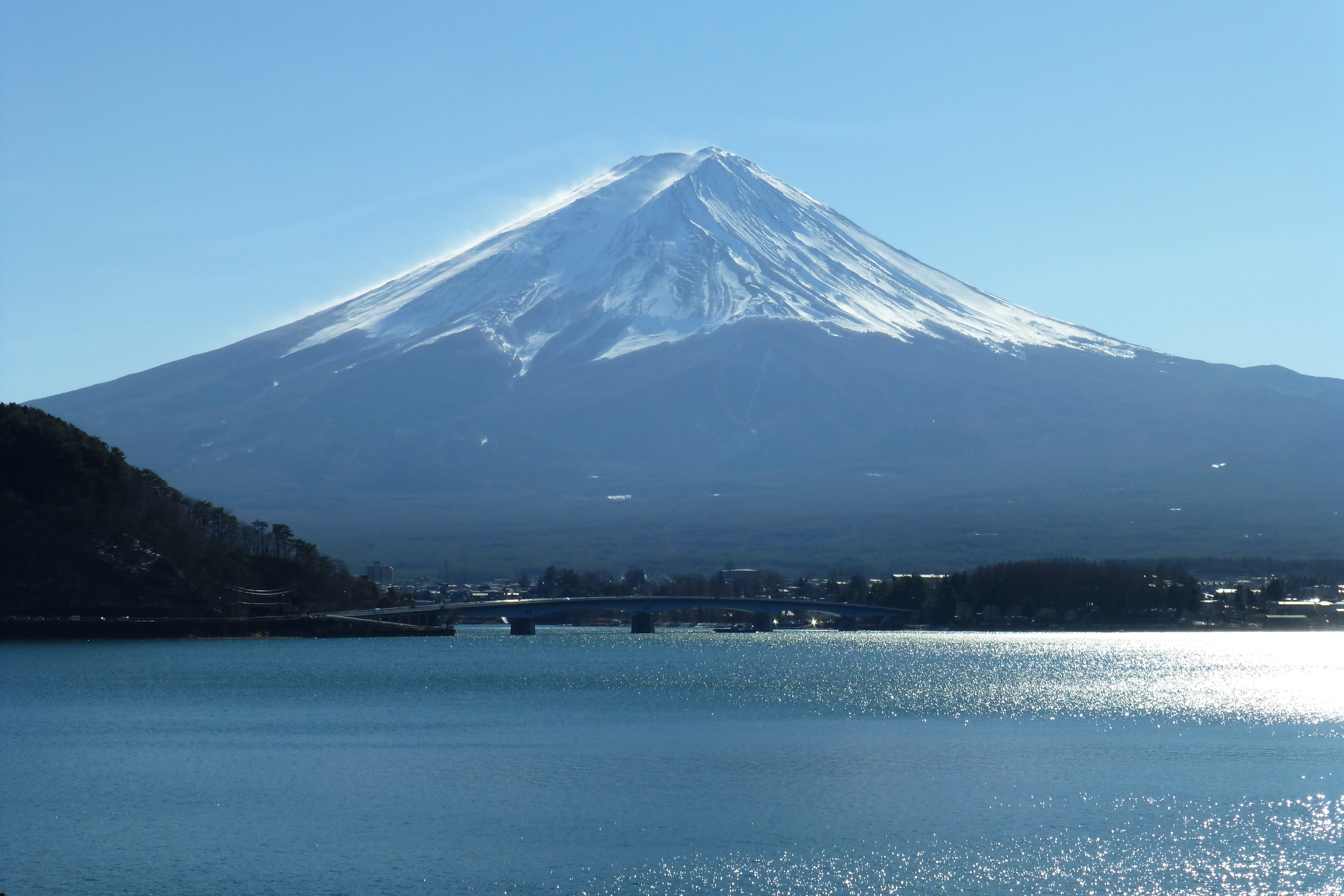
Many Andisols develop in the immediate vicinity of volcanoes

In USDA soil taxonomy, andisols are soils formed in volcanic ash and defined as soils containing high proportions of glass and amorphous colloidal materials, including allophane, imogolite and ferrihydrite. In the World Reference Base for Soil Resources (WRB), andisols are known as Andosols.

Because they are generally quite young, andisols typically are very fertile except in cases where phosphorus is easily fixed (this sometimes occurs in the tropics). They can usually support intensive cropping, with areas used for wet rice in Java supporting some of the densest populations in the world. Other andisol areas support crops of fruit, maize, tea, coffee, or tobacco. In the Pacific Northwest US, andisols support very productive forests.

Andisols occupy about 1% of the global ice-free land area. Most occur around the Pacific Ring of Fire, with the largest areas found in central Chile, Ecuador, Colombia, Mexico, the Pacific Northwest US, Japan, Java and New Zealand's North Island. Other areas occur in the Great Rift Valley, Kenya, Italy, Iceland and Hawaiʻi.

Fossil andisols are known from areas far from present-day volcanic activity and have in some cases been dated as far back as the Mesoproterozoic 1.5 billion years ago.

== Suborders ==
- Aquands – Andisols with a water table at or near the surface for much of the year.
- Gelands – Andisols of very cold climates (mean annual temperature <0 °C).
- Cryands – Andisols of cold climates.
- Torrands – Andisols of very dry climates.
- Ustands – Andisols of semiarid and subhumid climates.
- Udands – Andisols of humid climates.
- Xerands – Temperate andisols with very dry summers and moist winters.
- Vitrands – Relatively young andisols that are coarse-textured and dominated by glass.

== See also ==
- Pedogenesis
- Pedology (soil study)
- Soil classification
