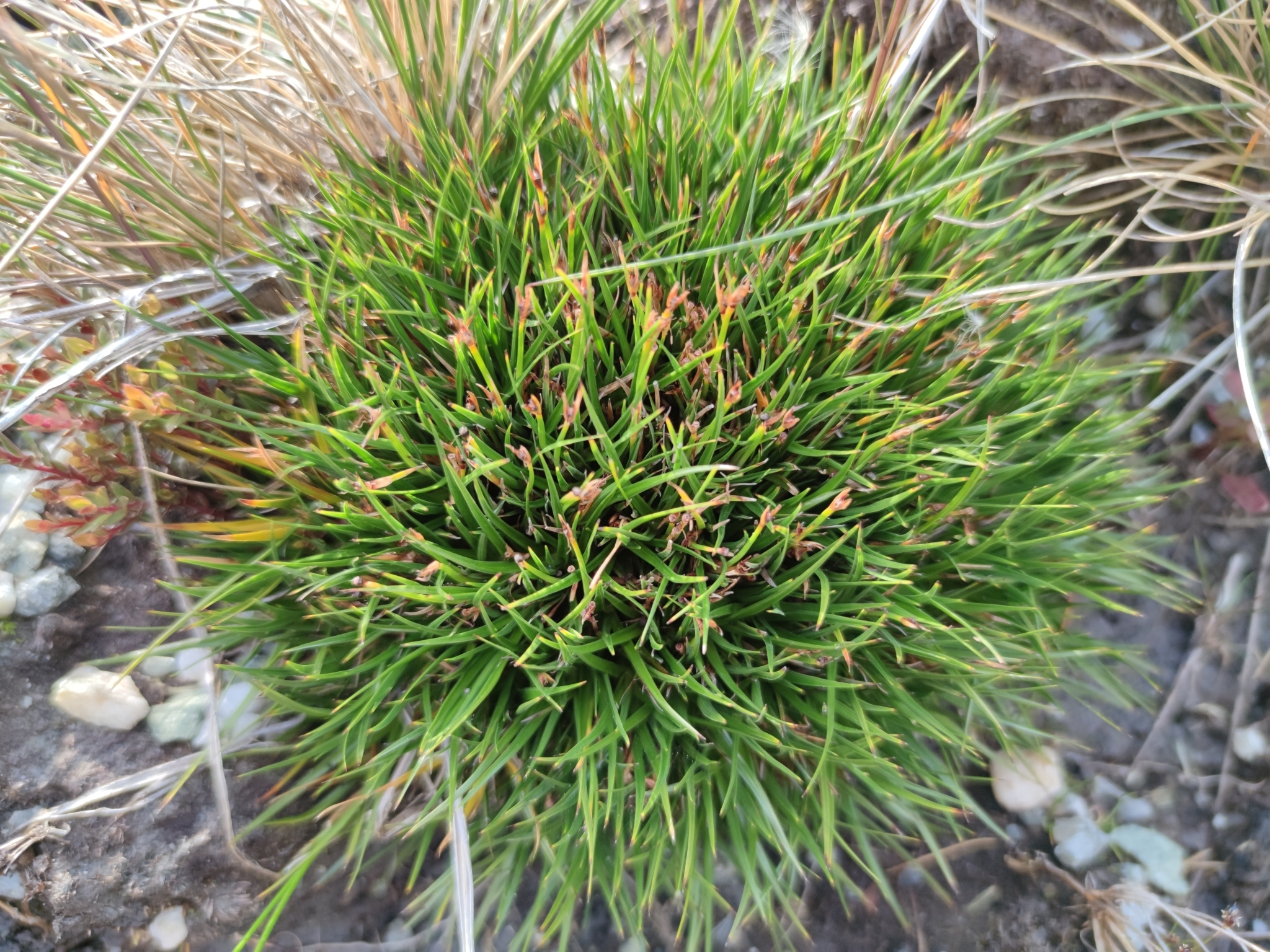

Scientific classification
- Kingdom: Plantae
- Clade: Tracheophytes
- Clade: Angiosperms
- Clade: Monocots
- Clade: Commelinids
- Order: Poales
- Family: Cyperaceae
- Genus: Oreobolus
- Species: O. obtusangulus

Binomial name
- Oreobolus obtusangulus Gaudich.

Synonyms
- Gaimardia australis; Gaimardia pusilla; Oreobolus clandestinus; Oreobolus obtusangulus var. f. borealis

= Oreobolus obtusangulus =

Species of grass-like plant

Oreobolus obtusangulus is a thick cushion-forming, grass-like flowering plant species in the family Cyperaceae. It is native to South America. It grows in the highlands of Colombia and Venezuela and the alpine wetlands of central Chile and Neuquén Province of Argentina. Further south it grows at lower elevations including Tierra del Fuego and the Falkland Islands. Oreobolus obtusangulus grows in parts of Patagonia that were glaciated during the last glaciation. A genetic study suggested that the species survived glaciation in three separate glacial refugia; these being south-central Chile, the eastern Patagonian Andes and eastern Tierra del Fuego.
