= Lahuen Ñadi Natural Monument =

Natural area in southern Chile

- IUCN category III (natural monument or feature)
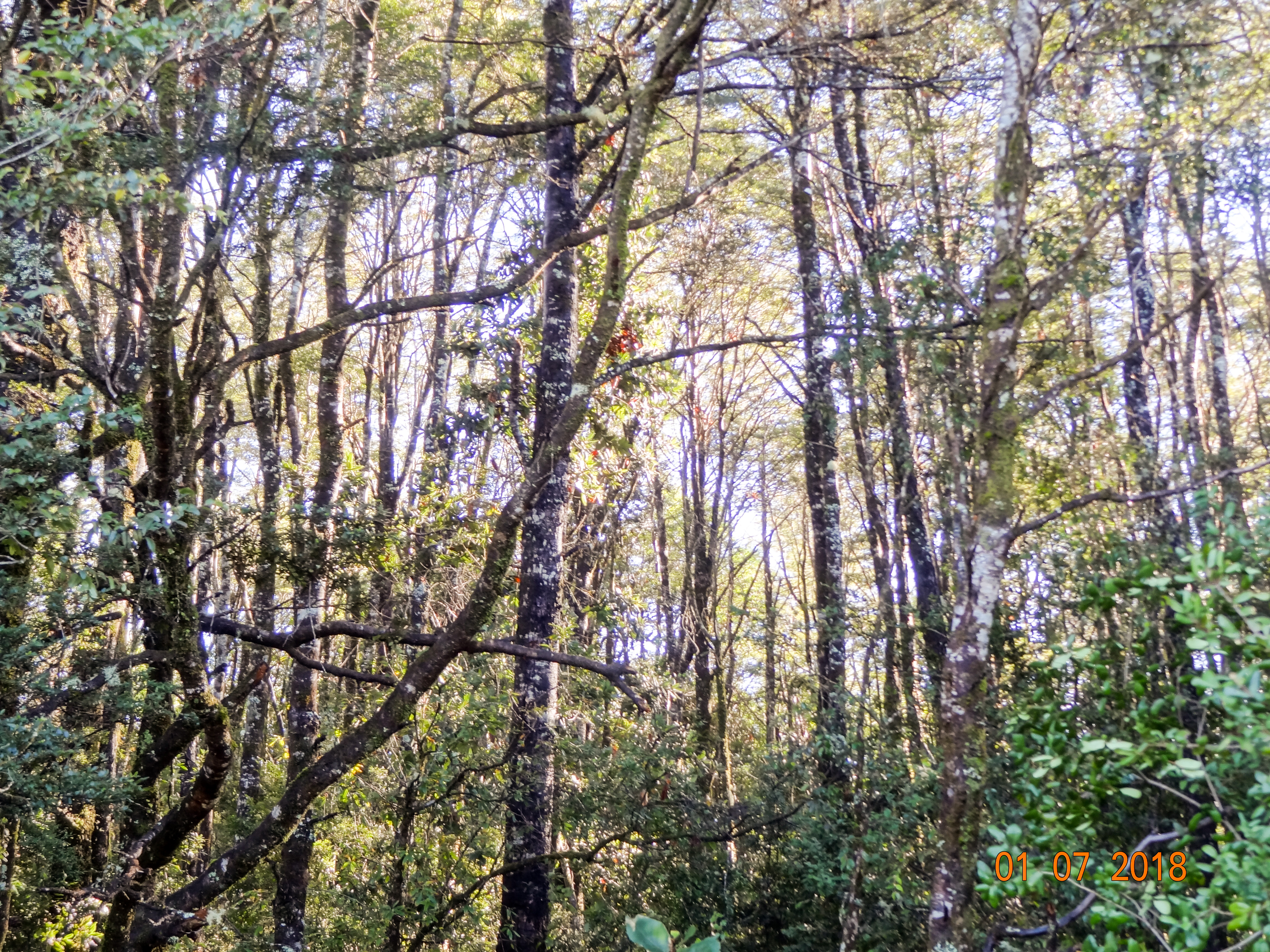

- Location within Chile
- Location: Los Lagos Region, Chile
- Nearest city: Puerto Montt
- Coordinates: 41°24′32″S 73°02′02″W
- Area: 2 km^{2} (0.77 mi^{2})

Lahuen Ñadi Natural Monument is a 2 km^{2} (0.77 mi^{2}) protected ñadi area in Los Lagos Region of southern Chile. It is located between Puerto Montt and Puerto Varas. Lahue Ñadi is one of the few places in the Chilean Central Valley where mature Fitzroya stands are preserved, some of them reaching ages of 1800 years.
