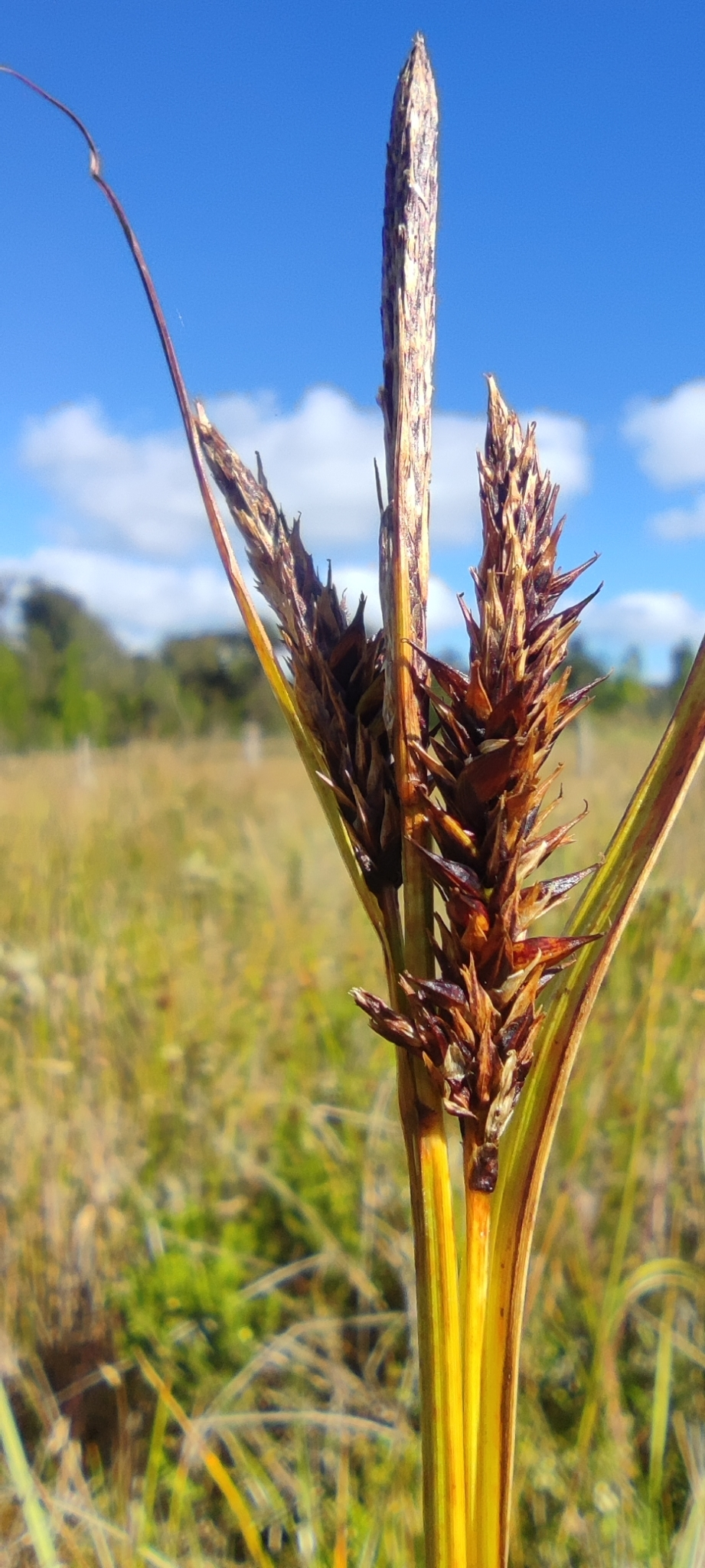

Scientific classification
- Kingdom: Plantae
- Clade: Tracheophytes
- Clade: Angiosperms
- Clade: Monocots
- Clade: Commelinids
- Order: Poales
- Family: Cyperaceae
- Genus: Carex
- Species: C. werdermannii

Binomial name
- Carex werdermannii L.Gross

= Carex werdermannii =

Species of sedge

Carex werdermannii is a species of flowering plant in the sedge family. It is endemic to southern Chile.
