= Eupithecia guayacanae =

Scientific classification
- Kingdom: Animalia
- Phylum: Arthropoda
- Class: Insecta
- Order: Lepidoptera
- Family: Geometridae
- Genus: Eupithecia
- Species: E. guayacanae

Binomial name
- Eupithecia guayacanae Rindge, 1991

Species of moth

Eupithecia guayacanae is a moth in the family Geometridae. It is found the Region of Santiago (Santiago Province) in Chile. The habitat consists of the Central Valley Biotic Province.

The length of the forewings is about 10 mm for males.
