= Rucamanque =

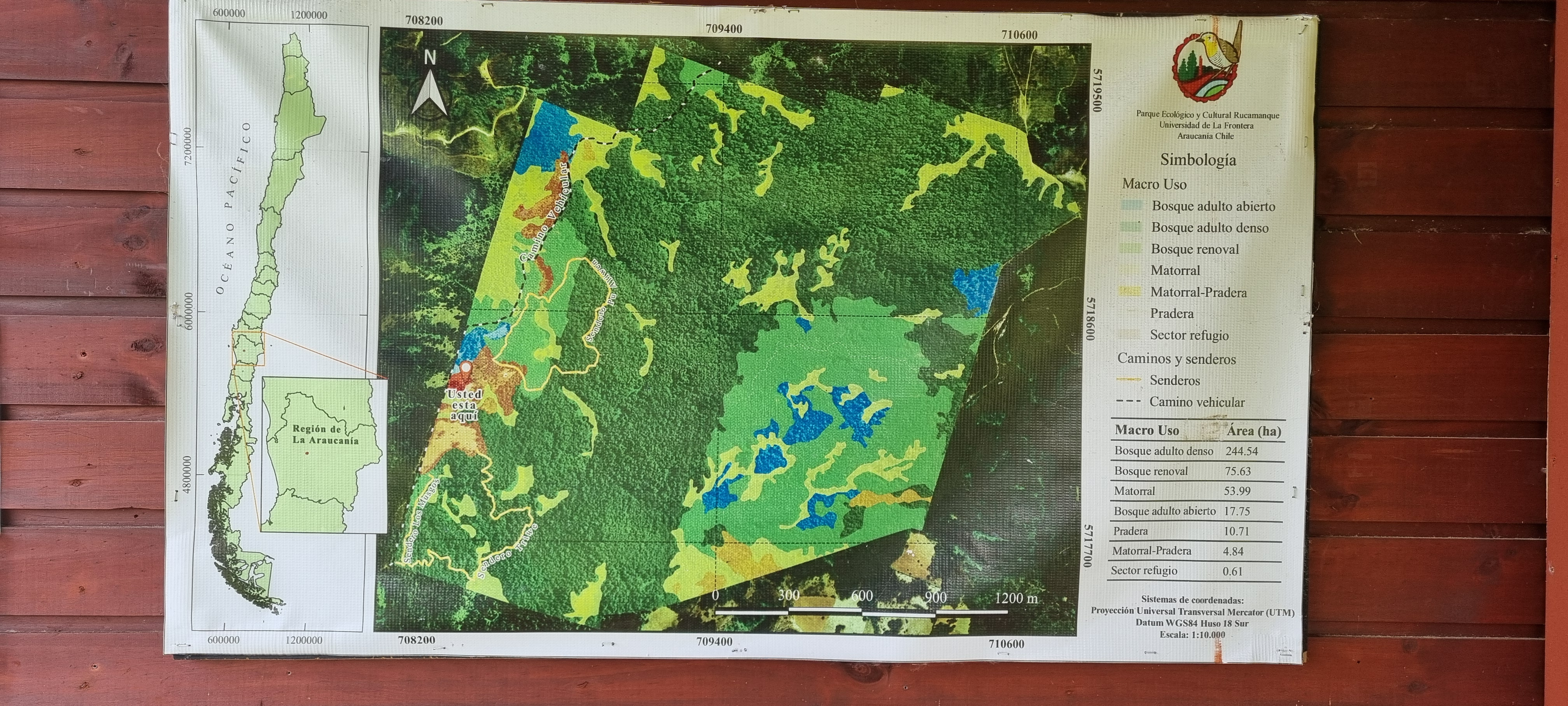
Rucamanque Ecological and Cultural Park

Rucamanque is a property owned by the Universidad de La Frontera in Chile, with a total area of 435.1 hectares, that is used for research, environmental education, and conservation. Rucamanque is located in south-central Chile (38 degrees 39 S, 72 degrees 35 W), at 376 m of altitude, County of Temuco, Cautın, IX Region, Chile.

Rucamanque is a mapuche word that means Casa del Condor [Condor's house]. Rucamanque was long protected by the Chilean government because it has forests that cover a small watershed with water source for Temuco city. Later, Rucamanuqe was bought by the Universidad de La Frontera. Further details on the history of Rucamanque were reported by Salas (2001).

== Forests ==
Rucamanque has two main type of forests (according to its structure): old-growth and second-growth stands.

The old-growth stands at Rucamanque are late successional stage forests, dominated by shade-tolerant tree species, with scattered 260- to 460-year-old Nothofagus obliqua (Roble) trees (Salas and Garcia, 2006). The old-growth stands at Rucamanque averages 590 trees/ha, 93.7 m2/ha of basal area, and 1096.7 m3/ha total volume, with the most abundant tree species being Aextoxicon punctatum. N. obliqua constitutes about 20% of the volume and basal area, with approximately 30 trees/ha and diameter at breast height (dbh) values over 70 cm. Stands of this type are remnants of the original sub-type of the N. obliqua–N.alpina–N. dombeyi forest type according to Donoso (1995). Botanically, this type of forest is classified as the Lapagerio–Aextoxiconetum punctatii association according to Oberdorfer (1960). Further details about ecology of these species can be found in Veblen et al. (1979, 1996), Veblen and Schlegel (1982), and Donoso (1994, 1995). The old-growth forest has had practically no human intervention. It is located at an altitude of between 350 and 450 m, on deep rich soils derived from volcanic ash (trumaos), where productivity is above average (Frank, 1998; Salas, 2001). Further details are given by Salas (2001, 2002).

The second-growth forests, are even-aged fire-origin second-growth (renoval) dominated by Roble (67% in number of trees, and 75% in basal area), with averages of 1006 stems/ha and 55 m2/ha of basal area. They belong to the second-growth forests sub-type of the Roble-Rauli-Coigue forest type according to Donoso (1995). Tree ages range from 63 to 109 years (Salas and Garcia 2006).
