= Trumao =

- Profile: A-(AB)-BA-2C (Note: This is an example of a typical profile of the Central Valley. The last horizon may alternatively be R instead of 2C.)
- Key process: weathering
- Parent material: primary tephra, or tephra redeposited as alluvium or by wind
- Climate: humid

Trumao is the name of a soil of the Andosol order found in southern and central Chile. Trumaos are formed from young volcanic ash, by volcanic ash redeposited by aeolian processes or by volcanic ash mobilized as alluvium. Trumaos are characterized by containing the following minerals: allophane, imogolite plus a series of paracrystalline and non-crystalline clays. These soils have high porosity and low bulk density. A more dry and a more humid variety of trumaos exists. The dry variety is known simply as trumao while the humid variety is known as trumao húmedo.

In terms of latitude trumaos can be found in the Andes from 33° S to 43° S, in the Central Valley from 38° S to 43° S and in the eastern slopes of the Chilean Coast Range from 39° S to 43° S.

== See also ==
- Andean Volcanic Belt
- Ñadi
