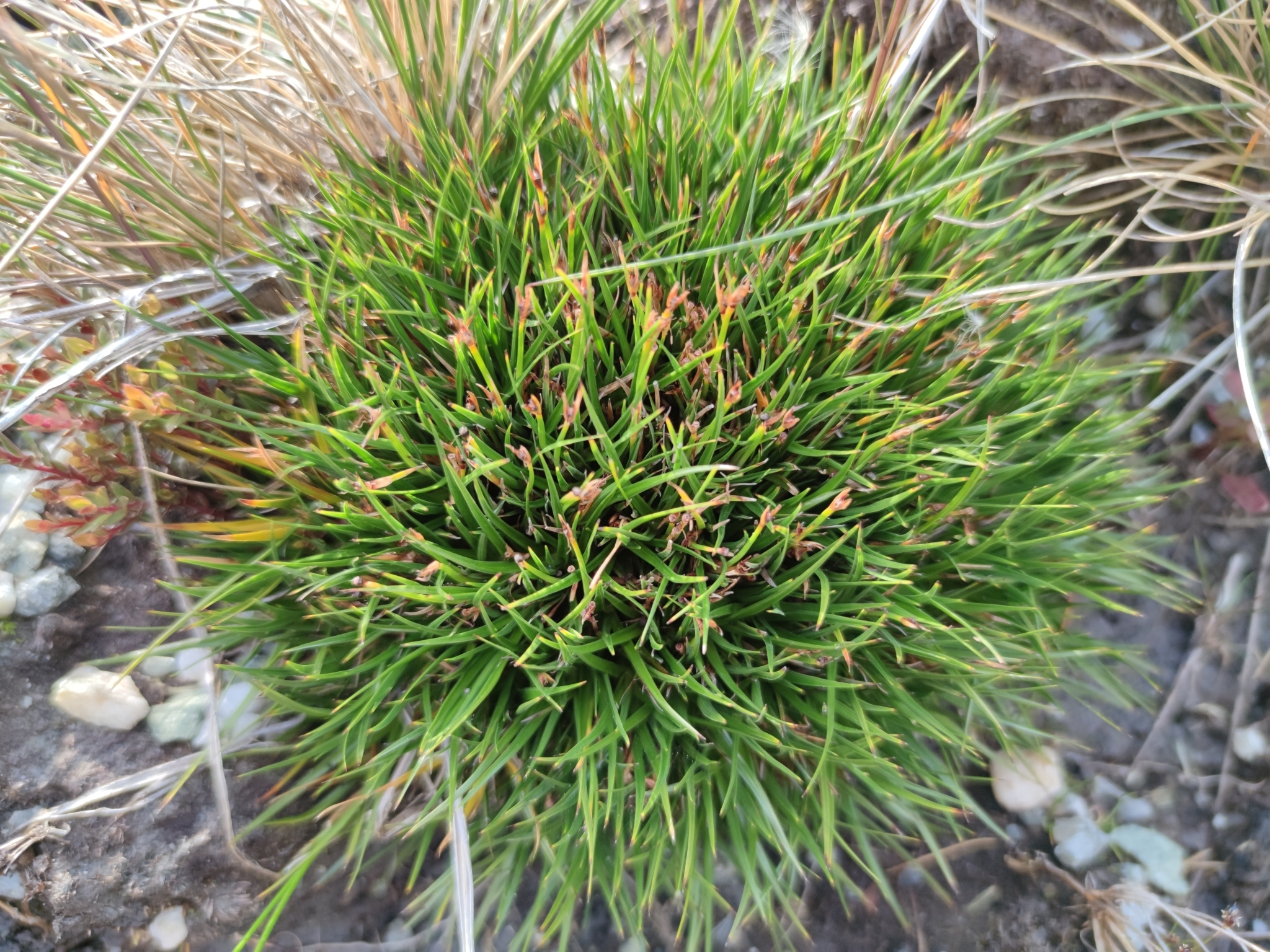
- Oreobolus obtusangulus

Scientific classification
- Kingdom: Plantae
- Clade: Tracheophytes
- Clade: Angiosperms
- Clade: Monocots
- Clade: Commelinids
- Order: Poales
- Family: Cyperaceae
- Genus: Oreobolus; R.Br.

Species
- List Oreobolus acutifolius S.T.Blake; Oreobolus ambiguus Kük. & Steenis; Oreobolus cleefii L.E.Mora; Oreobolus distichus F.Muell. Oreobolus ecuadorensis T.Koyama; Oreobolus furcatus H.Mann; Oreobolus goeppingeri Suess. Oreobolus impar Edgar; Oreobolus kuekenthalii Steenis ex Kük. Oreobolus obtusangulus Gaudich. Oreobolus oligocephalus W.M.Curtis; Oreobolus oxycarpus S.T.Blake; Oreobolus pectinatus Hook.f. Oreobolus pumilio R.Br. Oreobolus strictus Berggr. Oreobolus tholicarpus D.I.Morris; Oreobolus venezuelensis Steyerm.

= Oreobolus =

Genus of plants

Oreobolus is a genus of flowering plants in the family Cyperaceae. The genus has a circumpacific distribution. There are 17 species in the genus:

- Oreobolus acutifolius S.T.Blake
- Oreobolus ambiguus Kük. & Steenis
- Oreobolus cleefii L.E.Mora
- Oreobolus distichus F.Muell.
- Oreobolus ecuadorensis T.Koyama
- Oreobolus furcatus H.Mann
- Oreobolus goeppingeri Suess.
- Oreobolus impar Edgar
- Oreobolus kuekenthalii Steenis ex Kük.
- Oreobolus obtusangulus Gaudich.
- Oreobolus oligocephalus W.M.Curtis
- Oreobolus oxycarpus S.T.Blake
- Oreobolus pectinatus Hook.f.
- Oreobolus pumilio R.Br.
- Oreobolus strictus Berggr.
- Oreobolus tholicarpus D.I.Morris
- Oreobolus venezuelensis Steyerm.
