= Southern Chile =

Informal geographic region of Chile

Natural regions of Chile.

Southern Chile is an informal geographic term for any place south of Biobío River, the mouth of which is Concepción, about 300 kilometres (200 mi) south of Santiago. Generally cities like Temuco are considered to be located in the south despite being relatively close to the geographical center of Chile. This is mainly because mainland Chile ended in La Frontera until the occupation of Araucanía (1861–1883). Similarly, the Southern Chile wine region is close to the geographic center of the country, encompassing wine-growing areas in the Bío Bío Region and Araucanía Region.

Southern Chile may also refer to the Zona Sur region between Biobío and Chacao Channel, which is often also called the Chilean Lake District. It may also refer to the Zona Austral, also called the Extreme South.

== List of major cities in Southern Chile ==
Ordered from north to south.

- Temuco
- Valdivia
- La Unión
- Rio Bueno
- Osorno
- Puerto Varas
- Puerto Montt
- Castro
- Punta Arenas
