= Ñadi =

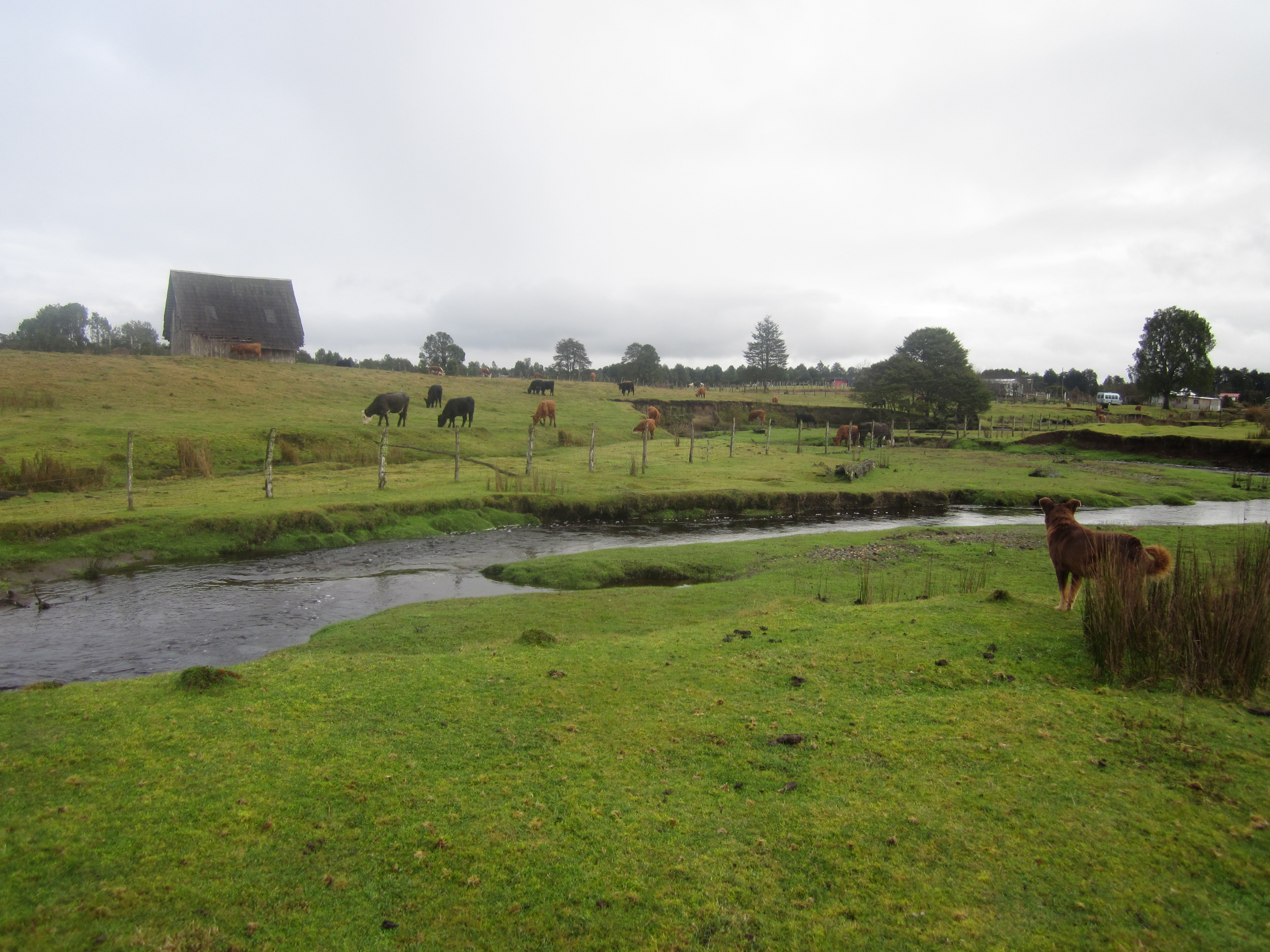
The archaeological site of Monte Verde is in a zone of ñadi soils.

Ñadi is a type of soil and a phytogeographic zone of Southern Chile. Ñadi soils are located in the Chilean Central Valley of Los Lagos Region, specifically between the moraines left by the region's most recent glaciation (the Llanquihue glaciation) and those of the penultimate glaciation (the Santa María glaciation). Ñadis have an impermeable layer, usually called fierrillo. In more technical terms this layer is a placic horizon that is chiefly made up by the minerals goethite and ferrihydrite. Ñadi soils are found between the latitudes 38 to 43° S.

== See also ==
- Lahuen Ñadi Natural Monument
- Trumao
