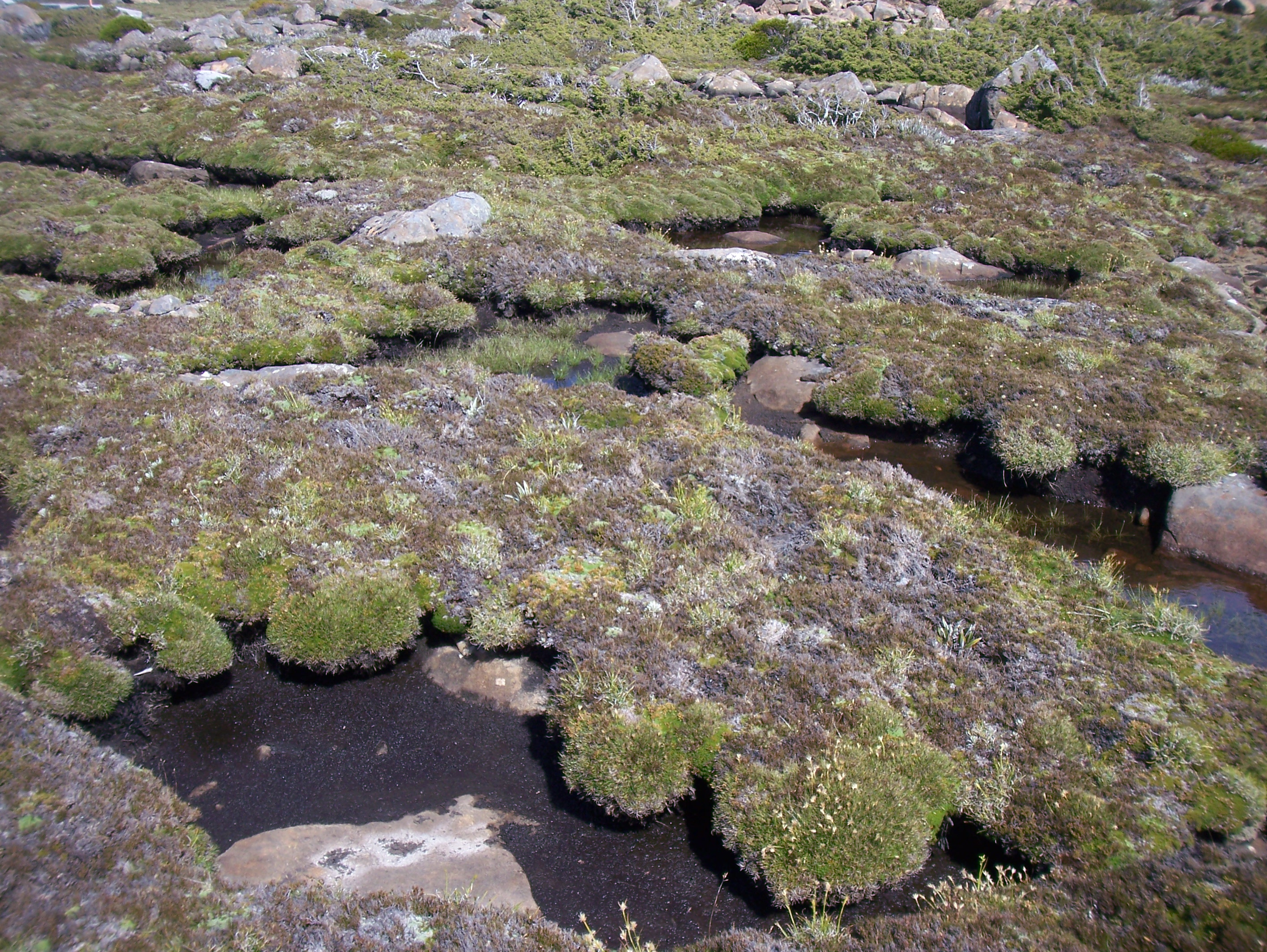

Scientific classification
- Kingdom: Plantae
- Clade: Tracheophytes
- Clade: Angiosperms
- Clade: Monocots
- Clade: Commelinids
- Order: Poales
- Family: Cyperaceae
- Genus: Oreobolus
- Species: O. pumilio

Binomial name
- Oreobolus pumilio R.Br.

Synonyms
- Oreobolus clemensiae Kük.; Oreobolus pfeifferianus Barros ex H.Pfeiff.; Oreobolus pumilio subsp. clemensiae (Kük.) O.Seberg

= Oreobolus pumilio =

Species of herb

Oreobolus pumilio, commonly known as alpine tuftrush or Ibrang`rank, is a small mat forming herb which is distributed throughout the Australasian region. It is a relative of the sedge. It is often found in cushion plant communities, in alpine environments, where it is a dominant species. As a cushion plant, it is an ecological engineer and enables other species to grow in the alpine herblands to which it is native to.

== Taxonomy ==
Oreobolus pumilio is a member of the Cyperaceae (sedge) family which is one of the main families of monocots. There are two subspecies of Oreobolus pumilio, the subspecies Oreobolus pumilio var. pumilio (alpine Tuft rush) which is endemic to southeast Australia, while the subspecies Oreobolus pumilio var. clemensiae is endemic to New Guinea.

== Distribution and habitat ==
Oreobolus pumilio is native to New Guinea and the southeast of the Australian continent. In these regions it is distributed in alpine habitats which lie between 900–2400 metres in altitude. This species is characteristic of several alpine habitat types such as montane button grass and is an indicator species of alpine short herbfields.

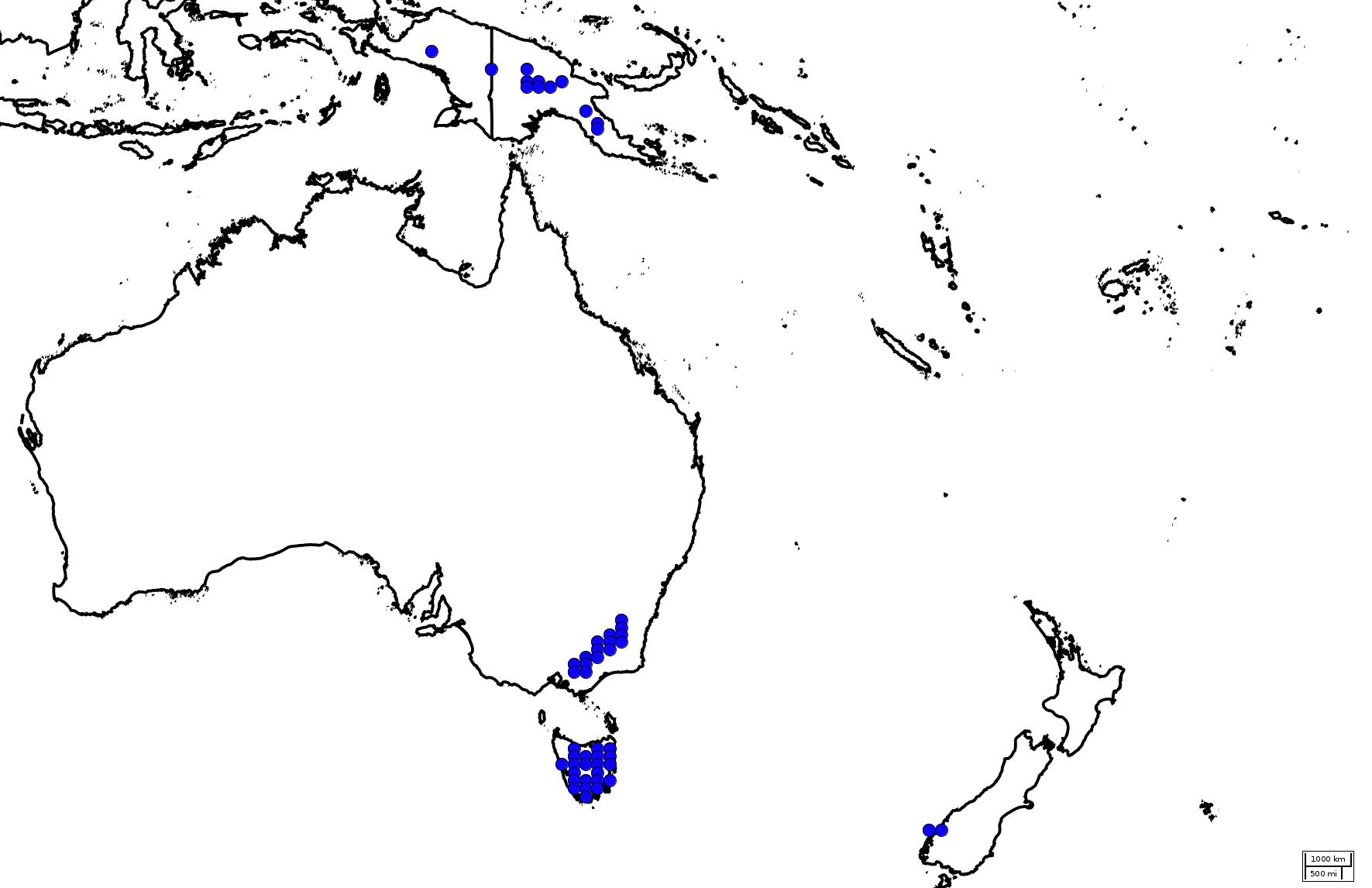
Distribution map of Oreobolus pumilio

== Morphology ==
Oreobolus pumilio is mat forming herb growing to 8 cm high with blade like leaves. Leaf colouration varies between a verdant green and a reddy-brown.

As Oreobolus pumilio grows in high alpine environments its short growth, like that of all cushion plants, is advantageous. This is because the environments, that they grow in, tend to have strong winds which may damage any leaves growing above the thin layer of still air that covers the ground.

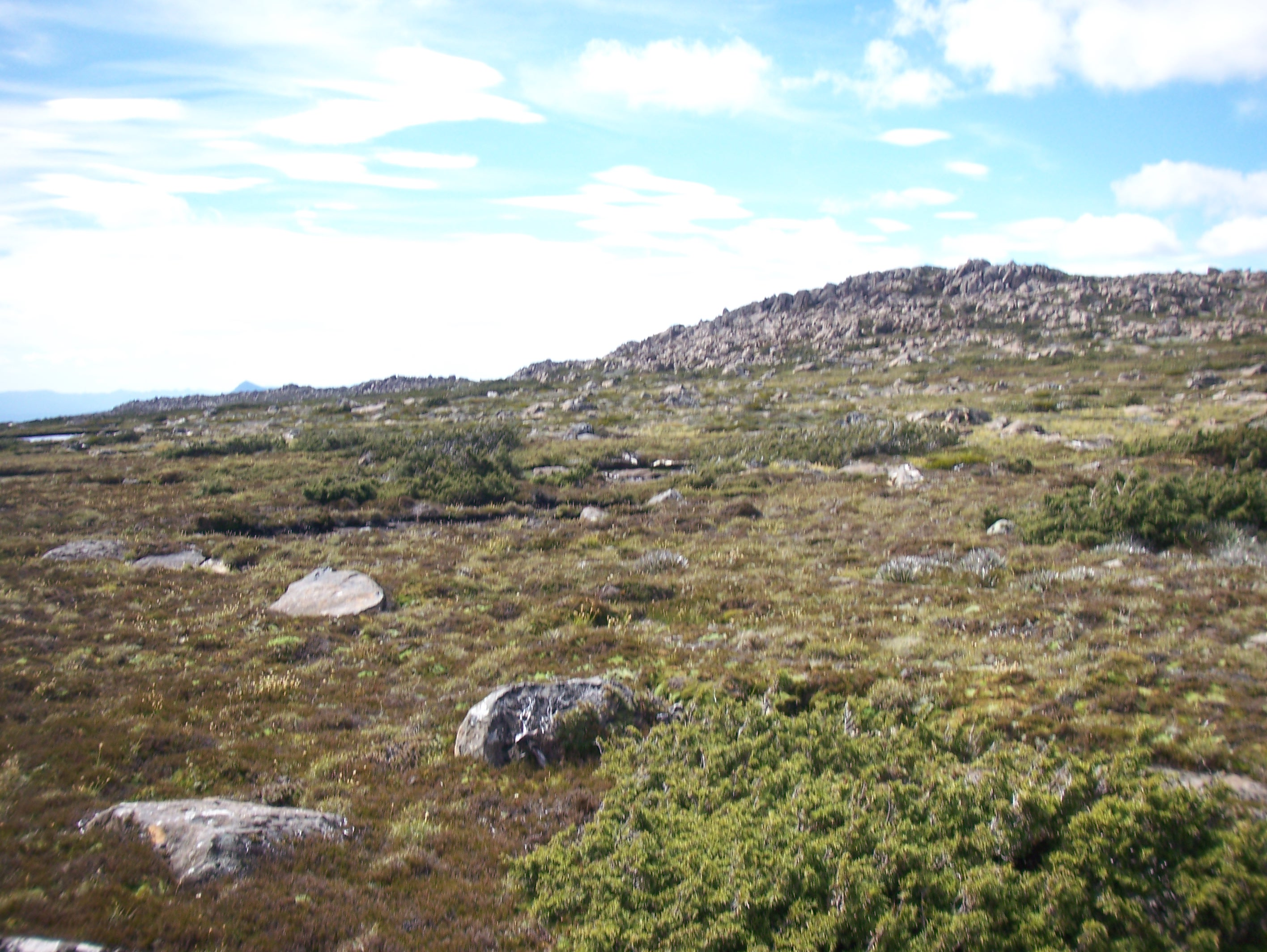
cushion plant community containing Oreobolus pumilio, at Newdegate pass

== Ecology ==
Oreobolus pumilio is one of the species in a cushion plant community. These communities are considered ecological engineers as they can have an effect on the environment such as the ability to produce a peat like soil. Also, these communities are known to enable some other species to live in environments which they would not usually be able to inhabit as they can increase water and nutrient availability.

== Conservation status ==
One subspecies, Oreobolus pumilio var pumilio, of Oreobolus pumilio is considered rare in Victoria
