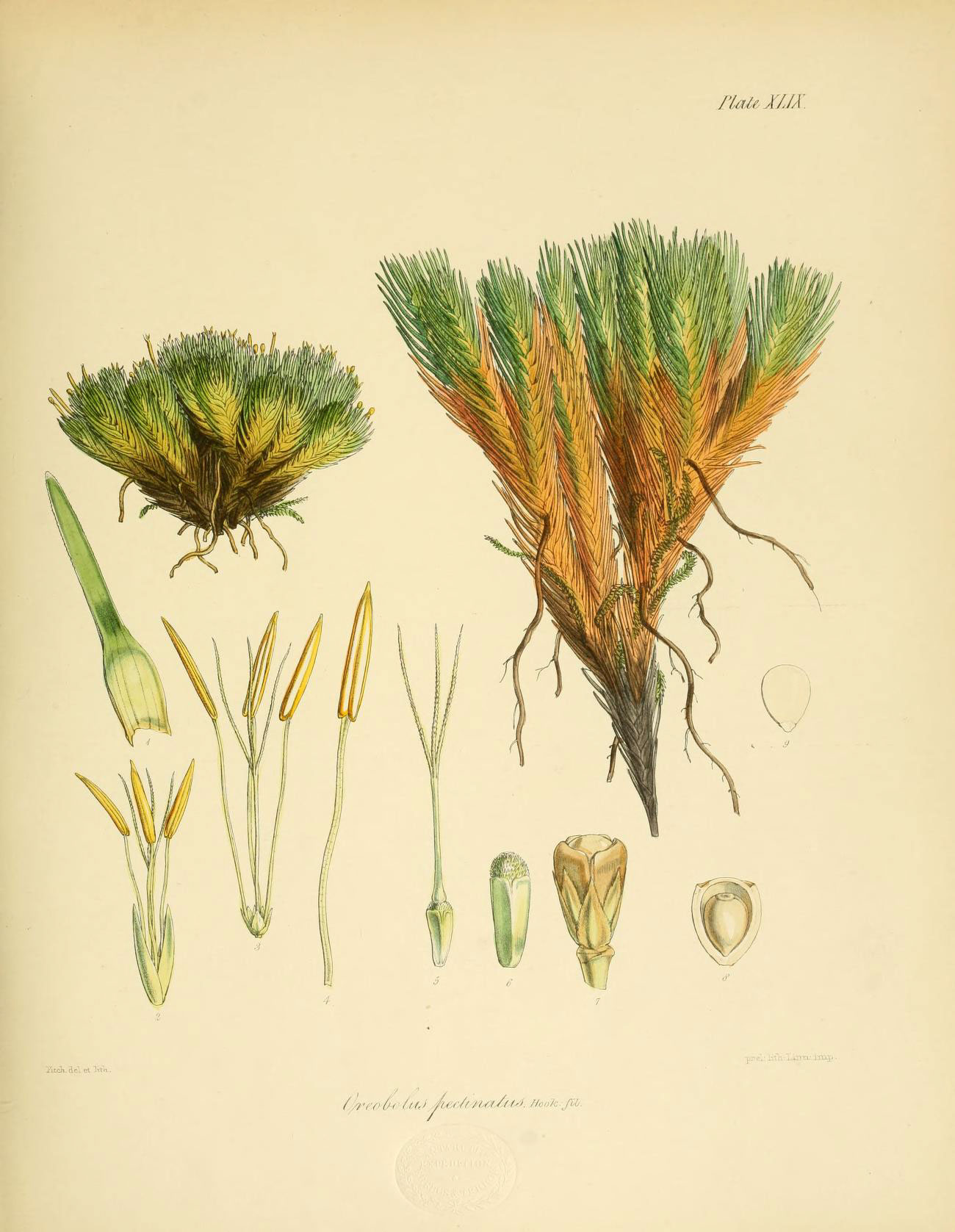
- Plate XLIX

Scientific classification
- Kingdom: Plantae
- Clade: Tracheophytes
- Clade: Angiosperms
- Clade: Monocots
- Clade: Commelinids
- Order: Poales
- Family: Cyperaceae
- Genus: Oreobolus
- Species: O. pectinatus

Binomial name
- Oreobolus pectinatus Hook f.

Synonyms
- Oreobolus pumilio var. pectinatus (Hook.f.) C.B.Clarke ex Cheeseman Oreobolus serrulata Colenso

= Oreobolus pectinatus =

Species of grass-like plant

Oreobolus pectinatus, commonly known as Comb sedge, cushion sedge, or flat-leaved comb sedge, is a species of flowering plant in the sedge family that is native to the subantarctic islands, and to the North and South Islands of New Zealand. The specific epithet derives from the Latin, pectin and pectinis, ('comb-shaped or like a comb'), and refers to the leaves.

== Description ==
Oreobolus pectinatus is a perennial sedge which forms dense cushions growing from 10 to 100 mm high. The stems are densely packed, much branched at base, leafy. Median nerve and two lateral nerves of the leaves are visible at widest part of lamina, while on the adaxial only the median nerve is prominent. Both surfaces of the lamina have abundant stomata. The sheath is not lobed at the apex and has 5 to 7 nerves. The spikelets are usually solitary and the mature peduncle is usually longer than the leaves. There are usually 3 glumes (sometimes 4), with the occasional fourth glume being smaller. The fruit, a nut, is initially colourless, but matures to a red-brown, almost black color. It is greater than 1 mm long and less than 1 mm diameter.

It flowers from October to December, and fruits from November to April.

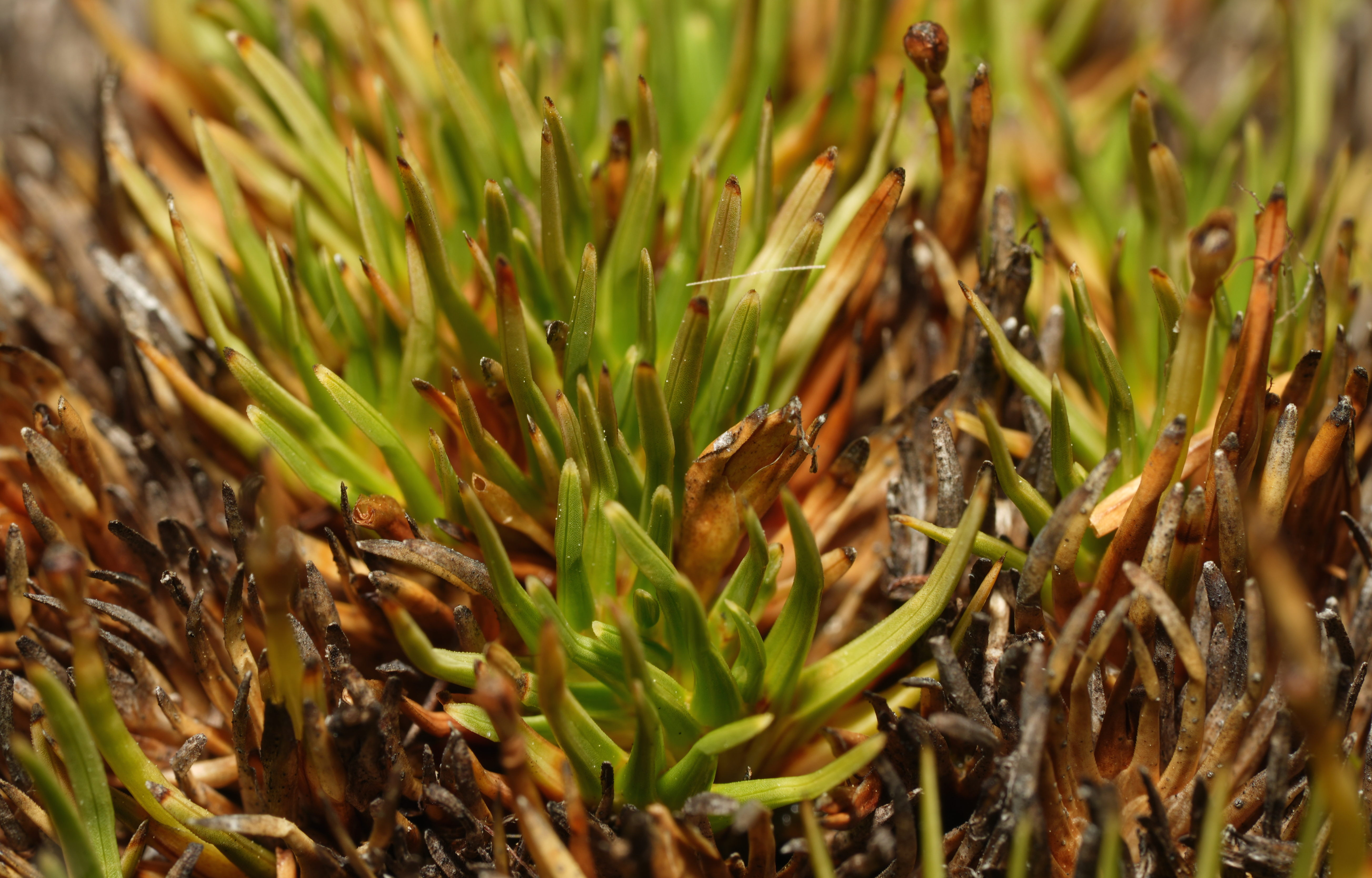
Oreobolus pectinatus as seen from the surface of an alpine bog, Old Man Range, Central Otago

== Distribution ==
The plant is found on New Zealand's Antipodean Islands, and the North and South Islands of New Zealand.

== Habitat ==
It is a coastal to alpine species (found up to 1500 m above sea level), occurring at sea level only in the southern South Island, and on Stewart, Auckland and Campbell Islands. It is common in cushion bogs, alpine seepages and mires.

== Conservation status ==
In both 2009 and 2012 it was deemed to be "Not Threatened" under the New Zealand Threat Classification System, and this classification was reaffirmed in 2018.
