= Southern Chile (wine region) =

The Southern Chilean Wine Region or The South is one of the five principal wine regions of Chile. It encompasses all wine-growing areas in of Bío Bío Region and Araucanía Region. The South wine region is composed of three minor wine districts; Itata Valley, Bío Bío Valley and Malleco Valley.
