= Chilean Lake District =

Zone in Southern Chile with many lakes

Principal lakes of the Chilean Lake District

The Chilean Lake District is a zone in Southern Chile defined by its many lakes in the Andean foothills. The term is primarily used in tourism literature and advertising, in Chile Zona Sur is preferred as a geographical concept. The Chilean Lake District includes the cities of Temuco, Villarrica, Pucón, Valdivia, Osorno, Entre Lagos (Puyehue), Puerto Octay, Frutillar, Puerto Varas and Puerto Montt.

All lakes drain ultimately to the Pacific Ocean. In the north to Toltén River collects the water of Villarrica, Caburgua and Colico. South of these lakes lie the Seven Lakes whose waters reach the Pacific through Valdivia River. Bueno River drains the water of Ranco, Maihue, Puyehue and Rupanco lakes. Llanquihue Lake is drained to the Pacific by Maullín River and Petrohué River does the same for Todos los Santos Lake.

In the west large lakes end in terminal moraines and fluvioglacial deposits that are made up of boulders and gravel. The lakes formed in the Quaternary period by glacier erosion. Towards the Andes some lakes have a continuation as U-shaped valleys.

== See also ==
- Road of the Seven Lakes
- Seven Lakes (Chile)
