= Imogolite =

Phyllosilicate clay mineral

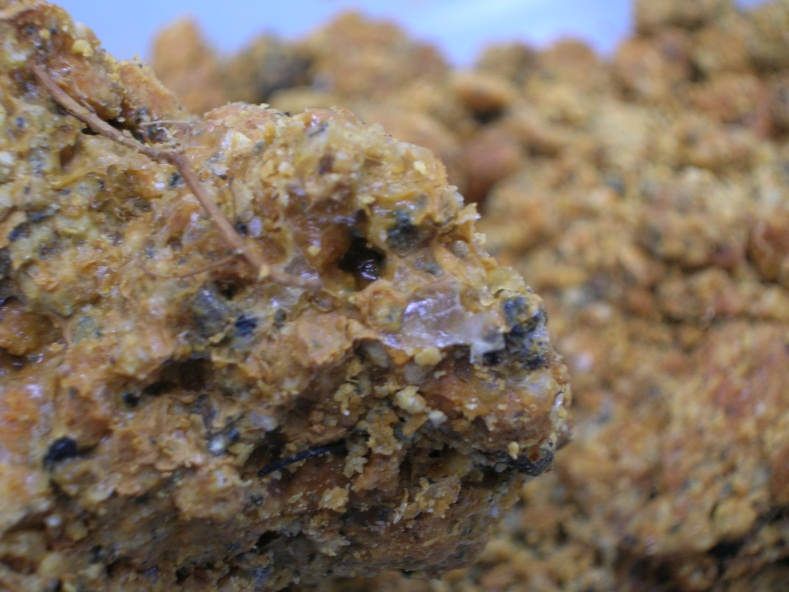
- Imogolite soil (brown) with fragments of transparent imogolite films

General
- Category: Phyllosilicate minerals
- Formula: Al_{2}SiO_{3}(OH)_{4}
- IMA symbol: Imo
- Strunz classification: 9.ED.20
- Crystal system: Tetragonal; Unknown space group

Identification
- Color: White, blue, green, brown, black
- Crystal habit: Conchoidal to earthy masses of microscopic threadlike particles and bundles of fine tubes, each about 20 Å in diameter
- Mohs scale hardness: 2–3
- Luster: Vitreous, resinous, waxy
- Diaphaneity: Transparent to translucent
- Specific gravity: 2.7
- Optical properties: Isotropic
- Refractive index: n=1.47–1.51

Imogolite is an aluminium silicate clay mineral with the chemical formula Al_{2}SiO_{3}(OH)_{4}. It occurs in soils formed from volcanic ash and was first described in 1962 for an occurrence in Uemura, Kumamoto prefecture, Kyushu Region, Japan. Its name originates from the Japanese word imogo, which refers to the brownish yellow soil derived from volcanic ash. It occurs together with allophane, quartz, cristobalite, gibbsite, vermiculite and limonite.

Imogolite consists of a network of nanotubes with an outer diameter of ca. 2 nm and an inner diameter of ca. 1 nm. The tube walls are formed by continuous Al(OH)_{3} (gibbsite) sheets and orthosilicate anions (O_{3}SiOH groups). Owing to its tubular structure, natural availability, and low toxicity, imogolite has potential applications in polymer composites, fuel gas storage, absorbents, and as a catalyst support in chemical catalysis.
