= Allophane =

Silicate clay mineraloid

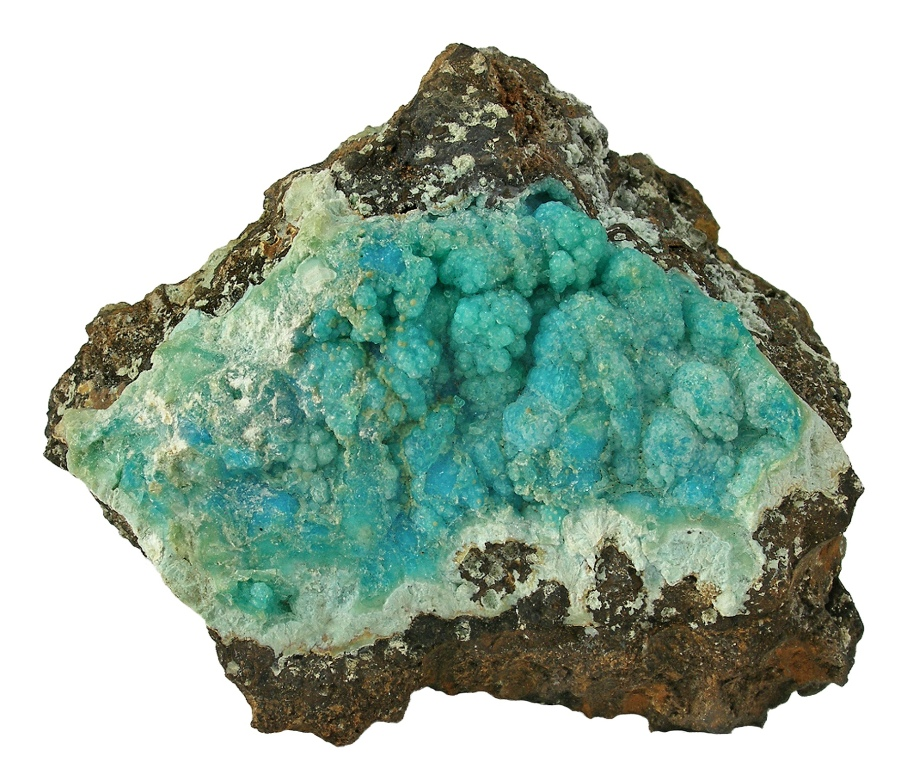

General
- Category: Phyllosilicate minerals
- Formula: Al_{2}O_{3}·(SiO_{2})_{1.3-2}·(2.5-3)H_{2}O
- IMA symbol: Alp
- Strunz classification: 9.ED.20
- Crystal system: Amorphous

Identification
- Color: White, pale blue to sky-blue, green, brown, yellow
- Crystal habit: Crusts and masses
- Cleavage: None
- Fracture: Conchoidal
- Tenacity: Brittle
- Mohs scale hardness: 3
- Luster: Waxy to earthy
- Streak: White
- Diaphaneity: Transparent, translucent
- Specific gravity: 2.8

Allophane is an amorphous to poorly crystalline hydrous aluminium silicate clay mineraloid. Its chemical formula is Al_{2}O_{3}·(SiO_{2})_{1.3-2}·(2.5-3)H_{2}O. Since it has short-range atomic order, it is a mineraloid, rather than a mineral, and can be identified by its distinctive infrared spectrum and its X-ray diffraction pattern. It was first described in 1816 in Gräfenthal, Thuringia, Germany. Allophane is a weathering or hydrothermal alteration product of volcanic glass and feldspars and sometimes has a composition similar to kaolinite but generally has a molar ratio of Al:Si = 2. It typically forms under mildly acidic to neutral pH (5–7). Its structure has been debated, but it is similar to clay minerals and is composed of curved alumina octahedral and silica tetrahedral layers. Transmission electron micrographs show that it is generally made up of aggregates of hollow spherules ~3–5 nm in diameter. Allophane can alter to form halloysite under resilicating aqueous conditions and can alter to form gibbsite under desilicating conditions. A copper-containing variety cupro-allophane has been reported.

It forms waxy botryoidal to crusty masses with color varying from white through green, blue, yellow, to brown. It has a Mohs hardness of 3 and a specific gravity of 1.0.

It was named from the Greek allos – "other" and phanos – "to appear", as it gave a deceptive reaction in the blowpipe flame in old mineralogical testing.
