= Aridisol =

Dry soil

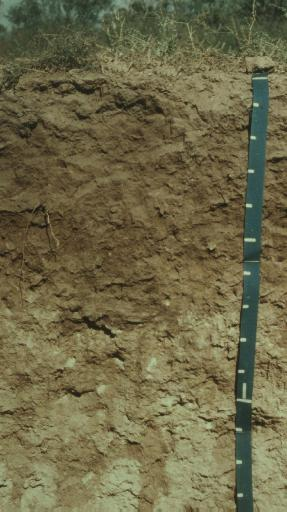
- an aridisol profile
- Used in: USDA soil taxonomy
- Key process: soil carbon oxidation
- Climate: desert, semi-arid

Aridisols (or desert soils) are a soil order in USDA soil taxonomy. Aridisols (from the Latin aridus, for "dry", and solum) form in an arid or semi-arid climate. Aridisols dominate the deserts and xeric shrublands, which occupy about one-third of the Earth's land surface. Aridisols have a very low concentration of organic matter, reflecting the paucity of vegetative production on these dry soils. Water deficiency is the central defining characteristic of Aridisols. Also required is sufficient age to exhibit subsoil weathering and development. Limited leaching in aridisols often results in one or more subsurface soil horizons in which suspended or dissolved minerals have been deposited: silicate clays, sodium, calcium carbonate, gypsum, or soluble salts. These subsoil horizons can also be cemented by carbonates, gypsum, or silica. Accumulation of salts on the surface can result in salinization.

In the World Reference Base for Soil Resources (WRB), most Aridisols belong to the Calcisols, Gypsisols, Durisols and Solonchaks.

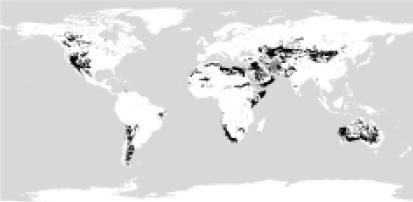
Aridisols of the world

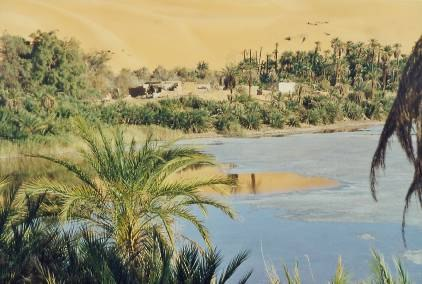
Some Aridisols are found in oases

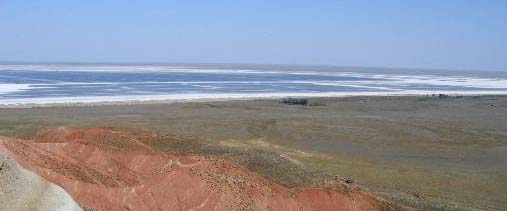
Other Aridisols are observed in areas where the steppe passes into the semi-desert, such as in the lower Volga region

== See also ==
- Desert ecology
- Pedogenesis
- Pedology
- Soil classification
- Soil science
- Soil type
- Calcid
