= Robert A.W. Carleton Strength of Materials Laboratory =

Civil engineering facility

Coordinates: 40.809441°N 73.959723°W

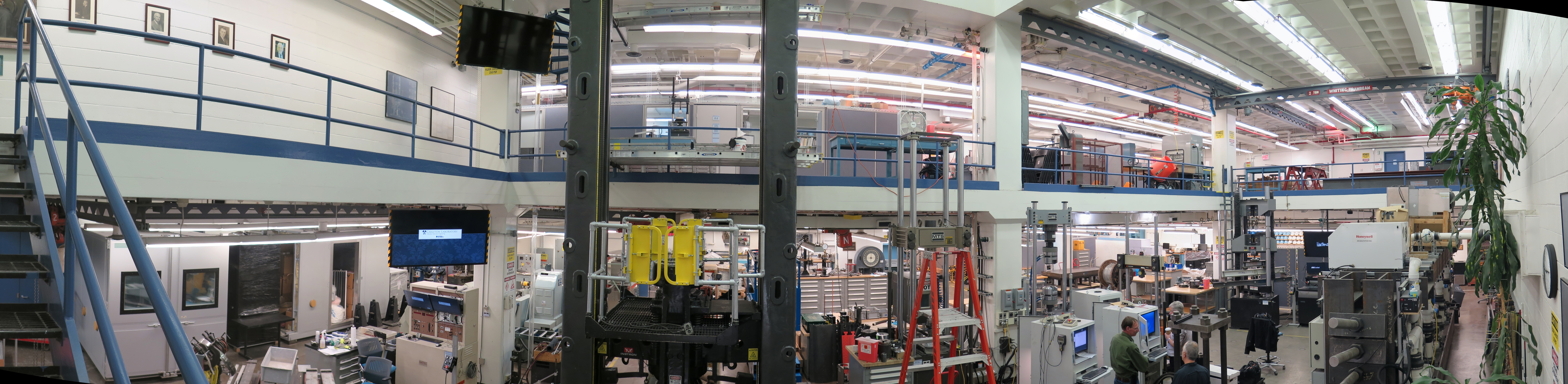
View of Carleton Laboratory testing hi-bay and mezzanine. An array of universal testing machines can be seen on the test floor.

Robert A.W. Carleton Strength of Material Laboratory (Carleton Lab) is a civil engineering materials testing laboratory affiliated with the Department of Civil Engineering and Engineering Mechanics (CEEM) in the Columbia School of Engineering and Applied Science. The laboratory is located on Columbia University's Morningside Heights campus in the City of New York. Carleton Laboratory provides educational facilities for the CEEM Department, supports research of infrastructure and principles of engineering, and conducts specialized testing of materials used in infrastructure in the City of New York and internationally.

== Overview ==
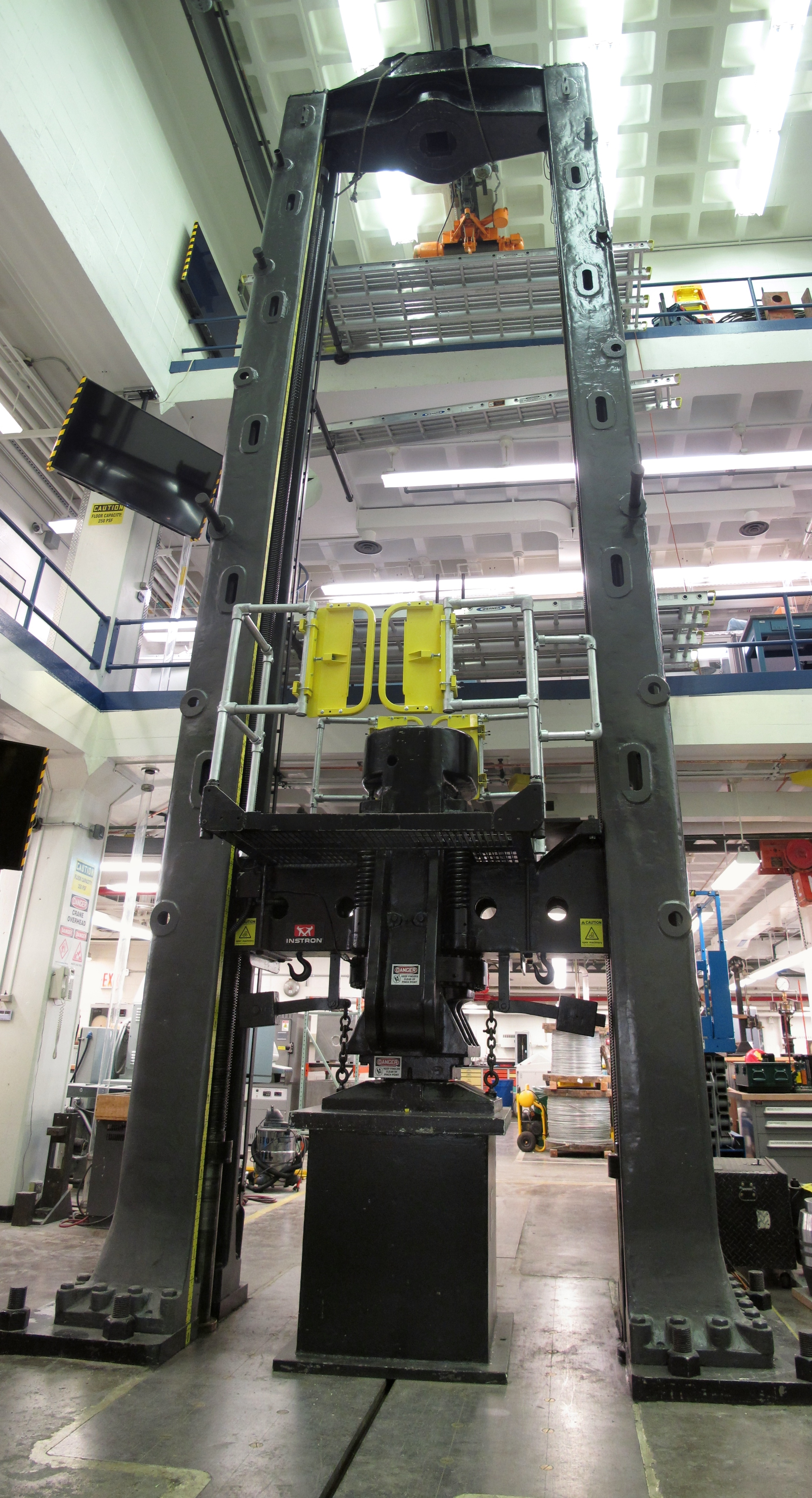
The Southwark Emery universal testing machine has a capacity of 600,000 lb (3 MN) and can test specimens up to 18 ft (5.5 m) tall.

Carleton Lab, an endowed research center overseen by the Trustees of the Robert A.W. Carleton Laboratory, is one of the largest labs on Columbia’s Morningside Heights campus.

Within the lab, students may participate in hands-on engineering testing through courses such as Soil Mechanics, Experimental Soil Mechanics, Structural Assessment and Failure, Experimental Mechanics of Materials, Fluid Mechanics, The Art of Engineering, and Independent Study courses. The lab hosts the Columbia University chapter of the American Society of Civil Engineers/American Institute of Steel Construction Steel Bridge competition.

=== Member laboratories ===
The Carleton Lab hosts various specialized laboratories within its proper:

- Centrifuge Laboratory
- Concrete Materials Laboratory
- Donald M. Burmister Soil Mechanics Laboratory
- Eugene Mindlin Laboratory for Structural Deterioration Research
- Heffner Laboratory for Hydrologic Research
- Shake Table Laboratory
- Suspension Bridge Cable Monitoring
- Sensing, Monitoring, and Robotics Technology Laboratory (SMaRT)
- Sustainable Engineering and Materials Laboratory (SEML)

The Lab also maintains its own machine shop and library for staff, student, and faculty use.

=== Areas of research ===
- Structural deterioration
- Suspension bridge structural health monitoring
- Sustainable engineering and materials
- Sensing, monitoring, and robotics
- Hydrologic research
- Soil mechanics
- Geotechnical research and slope stability
- Structural dynamics
- Concrete mechanical, thermal, and acoustics research and modelling

== History ==
Robert A.W. Carleton graduated among the Class of 1904 with a degree of civil engineer from the School of Applied Science. After graduating, Carleton served as the lifetime Class President of the Class of 1904; Chairman of the Columbia University Engineering Center Fund Committee, the committee responsible for raising the funds to build engineering and science buildings on the Northeast corner of Columbia University's Morningside Campus; President of the Columbia Engineering Council; and a member of The Society of Older Graduates of Columbia.

Carleton also co-founded The Carleton Company, Inc. in the 1920s. The engineering firm that took part in the construction of the Pennsylvania Railroad, Long Island Railroad, the New York City Subway that ran under Eighth Avenue and Sixth Avenue, and the Holland Tunnel. Carleton was lauded for his ability to work on these transportation hubs without interrupting regular service. In 1941 Carleton negotiated with the United States Government so that The Carleton Company Inc. could build the largest receiving and distributing centers to support war efforts by facilitating the transfer of materials during the Second World War.

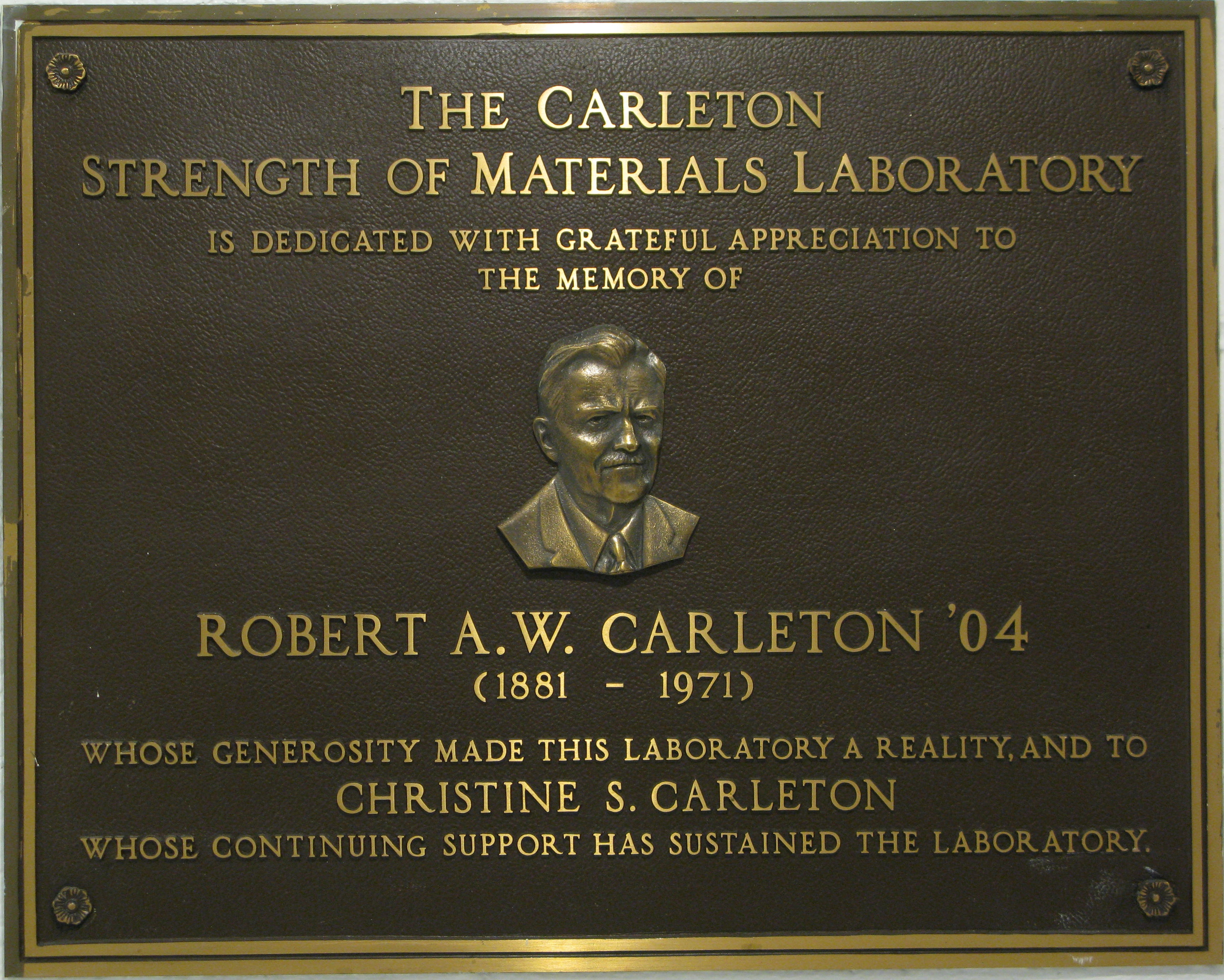
Bronze plaque located at the entrance of the laboratory, officially dedicating the space as the Robert A.W. Carleton Strength of Materials Laboratory.

Robert Carleton was appointed the head of the Engineering Center Development Fund Committee, which oversaw the fundraising and design of what would become the Seeley Wintersmith Mudd and the Engineering Terrace buildings. Under his leadership, construction of the facility was completed in six months. On 4 April 1959, Carleton was awarded the Egleston Medal, Columbia University’s highest award for distinguished engineering achievement due to the breadth of engineering work undertaken during his career.

In 1962, the Trustees of the University authorized the establishment of the Robert A.W. Carleton Strength of Materials Laboratory in the department of Civil Engineering and Engineering Mechanics, due to the support of Robert A.W. (1881–1971) and his wife Christine S. Carleton (1905–1983). Eight years later, the Columbia Engineering Alumni Association commissioned a portrait of Carleton, painted by artist Lester Bentley. The painting was dedicated and given a place inside the Monnell Engineering Library in the Seeley W. Mudd Building in December 1970. This painting has since been moved into Carleton Lab and placed at the top of the staircase on the main floor.

Robert A.W. Carleton died in 1971, but his wife continued to support Carleton Lab and Columbia Engineering in her husband’s name until her death in 1983.

=== Directors of Research ===
- William G. Burr (1893–1916)
- Albin S. Beyer (1917–1936)
- William J. Krefeld (1936–1960)
- Rene B. Testa (1965–1992, 2007–2013)
- Andrew W. Smyth (2013–2018)
- Adrian Brügger (2018–present)
