= Référentiel pédologique =

An English translation of soil types defined in "référentiel pedologique français" can be done this way. it is relevant for European soils:

- Alocrisol humic
- Alocrisol typic
- Aluandosol haplic
- Aluandosol humic
- Aluandosol perhydric
- Anthroposol artificial
- Anthroposol reconstituted
- Anthroposol transformed
- Arenosol
- Brunisol mesosatured
- Brunisol oligo-satured
- Brunisol resatured
- Brunisol satured
- Calcarisol
- Calcisol
- Calcosol
- Chernosol haplic
- Chernosol melanoluvic
- Chernosol typic
- Colluviosol
- Cryosol histic
- Cryosol mineral
- Dolomitosol
- Fersialsol calcic
- Fersialsol carbonated
- Fersialsol eluvic
- Fersialsol insatured
- Fluviosol brunified
- Fluviosol brut
- Fluviosol typic
- Grisol degraded
- Grisol eluvic
- Grisol haplic
- Gypsosol haplic
- Gypsosol petrogypsic
- Histosol composite
- Histosol fibric
- Histosol flottant
- Histosol leptic
- Histosol mesic
- Histosol recouvert
- Histosol sapric
- Leptismectisol
- Lithosols
- Lithovertisol
- Luvisol degraded
- Luvisol dernic
- Luvisol tronqued
- Luvisol typic
- Magnesisol
- Neoluvisol
- Organosol calcaire
- Organosol calcic
- Organosol insatured
- Organosol tangelic
- Paravertisol haplic
- Paravertisol planosolic
- Pelosol brunified
- Pelosol differencied
- Pelosol typic
- Peyrosol cailloutic
- Peyrosol pierric
- Phaeosol haplic
- Phaeosol melanoluvic
- Planosol distal
- Planosol structural
- Planosol typic
- Podzosol duric
- Podzosol eluvic
- Podzosol humic
- Podzosol humo-duric
- Podzosol meuble
- Podzosol ocric
- Podzosol placic
- Post-podzosol
- Pseudo-luvisol
- Quasi-luvisol
- Rankosol
- Reductisol
- Reductisol duplic
- Reductisol stagnic
- Reductisol typic
- Regosol
- Rendisol
- Rendosol
- Salisodisol
- Salisol carbonated
- Salisol chloruro-sulfated
- Silandosol dystric
- Silandosol eutric
- Silandosol humic
- Silandosol perhydric
- Sodisalisol
- Sodisol indifferencied
- Sodisol solodised
- Sodisol solonetzic
- Sulfatosol
- Thalassosol
- Thiosol
- Topovertisol
- Veracrisol
- Vitrosol
