= AASHTO Soil Classification System =

Classification of soils for road-construction purposes

The AASHTO Soil Classification System was developed by the American Association of State Highway and Transportation Officials, and is used as a guide for the classification of soils and soil-aggregate mixtures for highway construction purposes. The classification system was first developed by Hogentogler and Terzaghi in 1929, but has been revised several times since.

AASHTO Soil Classification System (from AASHTO M 145 or ASTM D3282)
General Classification	Granular Materials (35% or less passing the 0.075 mm (No. 200) sieve)							Silt-Clay Materials (>35% passing the 0.075 mm (No. 200) sieve)			
Group Classification	A-1		A-3	A-2				A-4	A-5	A-6	A-7
Group Classification	A-1-a	A-1-b	A-3	A-2-4	A-2-5	A-2-6	A-2-7	A-4	A-5	A-6	A-7-5 A-7-6
Sieve Analysis, % passing											
2.00 mm (No. 10)	50 max	...	...	...	...	...	...	...	...	...	...
0.4255 mm (No. 40)	30 max	50 max	51 min	...	...	...	...	...	...	...	...
0.0755 mm (No. 200)	15 max	25 max	10 max	35 max	35 max	35 max	35 max	36 min	36 min	36 min	36 min
Characteristics of fraction passing 0.425 mm (No. 40)											
Liquid Limit	...		...	40 max	41 min	40 max	41 min	40 max	41 min	40 max	41 min
Plasticity index	6 max		N.P.	10 max	10 max	11 min	11 min	10 max	10 max	11 min	11 min^{1}
Usual types of significant constituent materials	stone fragments, gravel and sand		fine sand	silty or clayey gravel and sand				silty soils		clayey soils	
General rating as a subgrade	excellent to good							fair to poor			

Plasticity index of A-7-5 subgroup is equal to or less than the LL - 30. Plasticity index of A-7-6 subgroup is greater than LL - 30.

== See also ==
- Unified Soil Classification System
