= Land use capability map =

Land use capability maps are maps created to represent the potential uses of a "unit" of land. They are measured using various indicators, although the most common are five physical factors (rock type, soil type, slope, erosion degree and type, and vegetation). In more scientific terms, these can be classed as lithology, edaphology, topography, gradient, and biotic features.

Land use capability maps must not be confused with land use maps. The former shows the potential uses (usually in relation to farming) whilst the latter shows the actual use for the land at the present time.

== See also ==
- Edaphic
- Geo-wiki
- Soil classification
