= Calcid =

Soil suborder in the USDA soil taxonomy

Calcids are a soil suborder in the USDA soil taxonomy. They are aridisols that have accumulated high levels of residual or dryfall calcium carbonate.

== Background ==
Calcids have a calcic or petrocalcic horizon and have carbonated materials in any above layers. The parent materials are high in content of carbonate, or carbonates were added as dust, or both. Precipitation has been insufficient to remove the carbonates or even move them to great depths. These soils are often found in the western states of the United States. Most areas are used as rangeland or wildlife habitat. Some are used as irrigated cropland.

Aridisols are CaCO_{3} containing soils of arid regions that exhibit at least some sub-surface horizon development. They are characterized by being dry most of the year, and exhibit limited leaching. Aridisols contain sub-surface horizon in which clays, calcium carbonate, silica, salts, and CaCO_{3} tend to be leached from soils of moister climates. Land dominated by Aridisols are used mainly for range, wildlife, and recreation. Because of the dry climate in which they are found, they are not used for agricultural production unless irrigation water is available. Aridisols are divided into 8 suborders: Cryids, Salids, Durids, Gypsids, Argids, Calcids, Orthids and Cambids.

== Chemical nature of calcid ==
Calcids have the extent of calcium carbonate so they can also known as calcareous soil or calcisols. Due to high calcium content, coarse texture, undulating surface, and even due to unsuitable climate, calcids are not suitable for fruit tree and crop cultivation. So, if these kinds of soils are irrigated and cultivated then micronutrient deficiency is normal. However, fine, loamy, textured calcids are good for agriculture.

== Other locations of Calcid ==
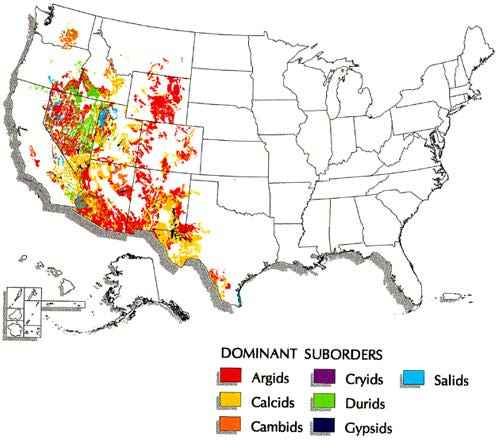
Calcids in western states.

These soils are often found in semi-humid to semi-arid regions. Therefore, about 7.89% of Iran is calcidic soil.

Similarly, Calcidic content can be also found in the soils of Rajasthan (India).

== Classification of calcid ==
There are different forms of calcids-

- Salicalcids
- Gypsicalcids
- Petrocalcids
- Hypercalcids
- Haplocalcids.

Out of all the calcids, haplocalcids contain various calcitic pro features.

=== Horizons ===
In terms of horizons,

Calcids have a calcic, hypercalcic, or petrocalcic horizon with its/their upper boundary within 1.0 m of the soil surface.

Within 0.75- 1m of the upper boundaries, calcids soils have no gypsic, hypergypsic or petrogypsic, or salic horizon.

== Reaction with other components ==
Different kinds of fertilizers and compost can be used to modify the properties of calcidic soils.

- Sulfur compost enhances the chemical properties for example- CEC, OM, and available micro and micronutrients, and increases the productivity of calcareous soil.
- In contrast, biochars even worsen the properties and productivity of calcids by increasing pH, and hence limiting crop productivity.
