= Donald Burmister =

- Born: 1895
- Died: May 15, 1981 (aged 97); Battle Creek, Michigan
- Education: Columbia University
- Scientific career
- Fields: Civil Engineering
- Workplaces: Columbia University

Donald M. Burmister (1895 – May 15, 1981) was a professor of civil engineering and a pioneer in the field of soil mechanics and geotechnical engineering.

== Career ==
Donald Burmister served as faculty member at Columbia University for 34 years, beginning in 1929. He was a consultant on the foundation design for many notable construction projects including the Brookhaven National Laboratory, Verrazzano–Narrows Bridge, Tappan Zee Bridge, first New York World's Fair at Flushing Meadows, and reconstruction of the White House in 1950.

Burmister authored over 35 research papers, particularly influential on the subjects of pavement design and soil classification. He developed a solution to calculate stresses and displacements in a two layer pavement system in 1943, and went on solve the problem for a three layer system in 1945. Prior to his solutions, engineers relied on equations by Joseph Valentin Boussinesq to calculate stresses and displacements in pavement, but these equation proved to be inaccurate in layered pavement systems. Tests have shown that for most pavements, the Boussinesq equations result in stresses larger than those measured and displacements larger than those measured. Burmister's layered solutions were a significant advancement in the practice of pavement design.

Burmister developed a soil classification system in 1950 that is still widely used today. The Modified Burmister classification system is based on grain size and plasticity, but differs from the Unified Soil Classification System in that it includes nomenclature to describe the soil's texture, color, mineralogy, and geological origin.

== Legacy ==
In honor of his legacy, the Burmister Lecture has been held annually since 1999 at Columbia University to showcase recent advancements in geotechnical engineering.
