= Desert ecology =

Study of interactions between both biotic and abiotic components of desert environments

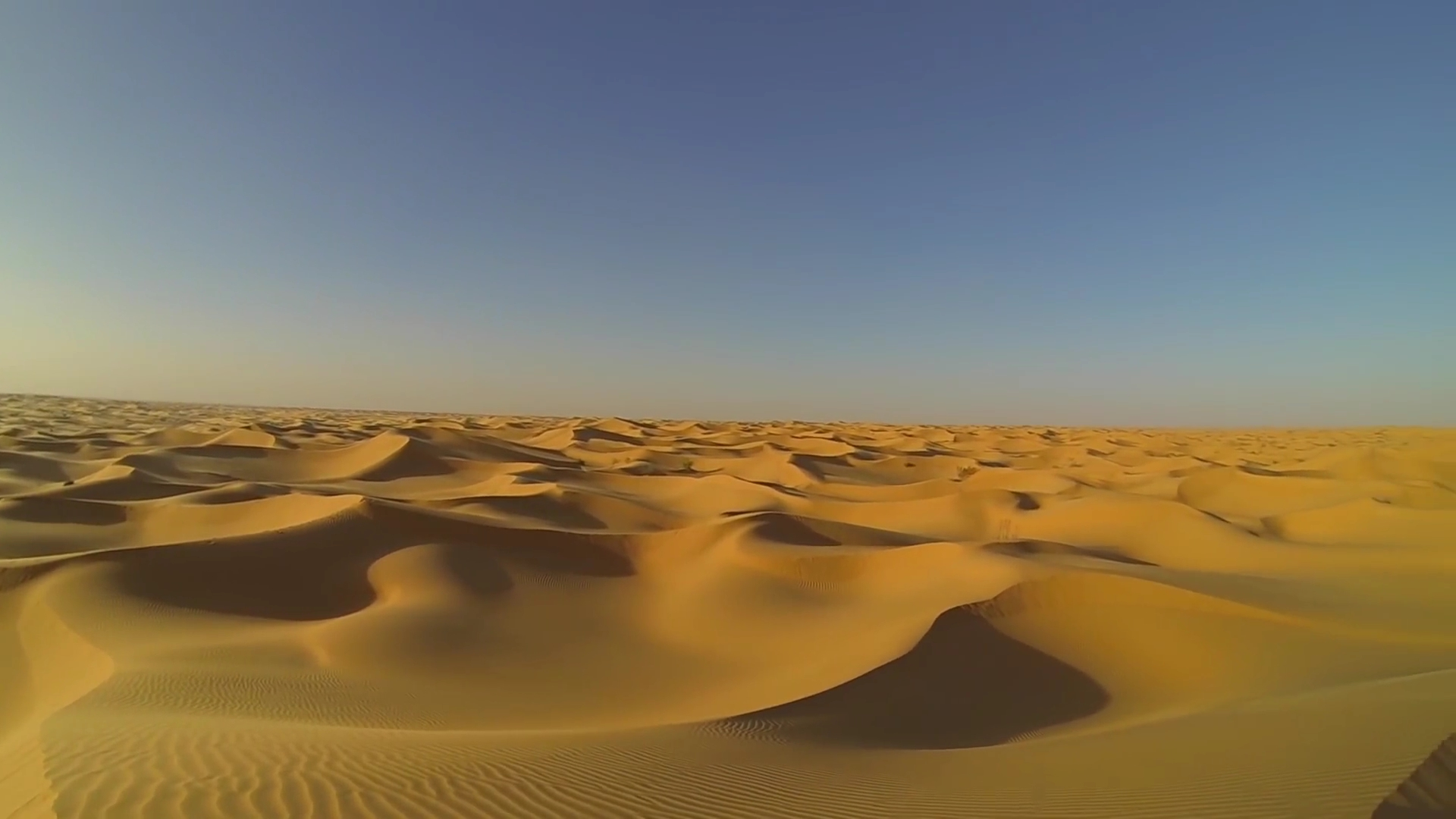
Sand dunes in the Sahara Desert

Desert ecology is the study of interactions between both biotic and abiotic components of desert environments. A desert ecosystem is defined by interactions between organisms, the climate in which they live, and any other non-living influences on the habitat. Deserts are arid regions that are generally associated with warm temperatures; however, cold deserts also exist. Deserts can be found in every continent, with the largest deserts located in Antarctica, the Arctic, Northern Africa, and the Middle East.

== Climate ==
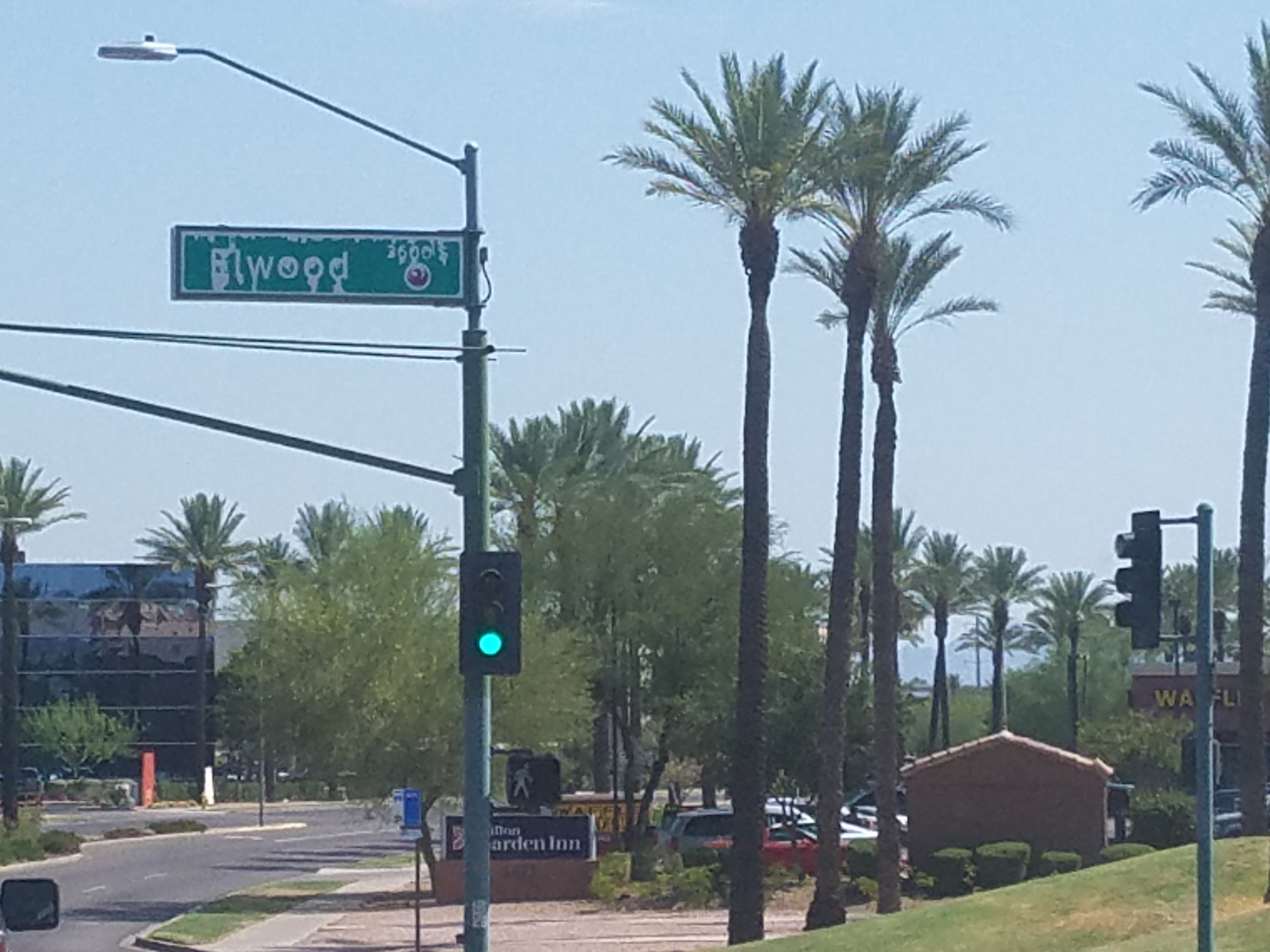
Temperatures were 115°F, enough to melt the street signs

Deserts experience a wide range of temperatures and weather conditions, and can be classified into four types: hot, semiarid, coastal, and cold. Hot deserts experience warm temperatures year round, and low annual precipitation. Low levels of humidity in hot deserts contribute to high daytime temperatures, and extensive night time heat loss. The average annual temperature in hot deserts is approximately 20 to 25 °C, however, extreme weather conditions can lead to temperatures ranging from -18 to 49 °C.

Rainfall generally occurs, followed by long periods of dryness. Semiarid deserts experience similar conditions to hot deserts, however, the maximum and minimum temperatures tend to be less extreme, and generally range from 10 to 38 °C. Coastal deserts are cooler than hot and semiarid deserts, with average summer temperatures ranging between 13 and 24 °C. They also feature higher total rainfall values. Cold deserts are similar in temperature to coastal deserts, however, they receive more annual precipitation in the form of snowfall. Deserts are most notable for their dry climates; usually a result from their surrounding geography. For example, rain-blocking mountain ranges, and distance from oceans are two geographic features that contribute to desert aridity. Rain-blocking mountain ranges create Rain Shadows. As air rises and cools, its relative humidity increases and some or most moisture rains out, leaving little to no water vapor to form precipitation on the other side of the mountain range.

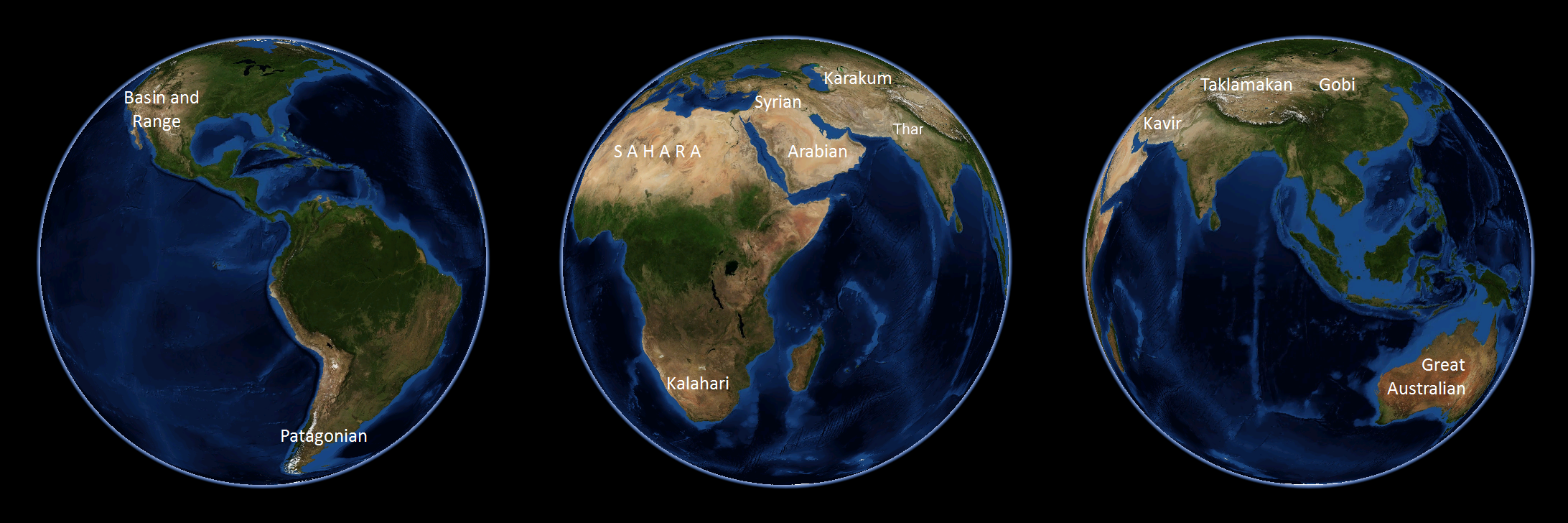
Deserts

Deserts occupy one-fifth of the Earth's land surface and occur in two belts: between 15° and 35° latitude in both the southern and northern hemispheres. These bands are associated with the high solar intensities that all areas in the tropics receive, and with the dry air brought down by the descending arms of both the Hadley and Ferell atmospheric circulation cells. Dry winds hold little moisture for these areas, and also tend to evaporate any water present.

Many desert ecosystems are limited by available water levels, rather than rates of radiation or temperature. Water flow in these ecosystems can be thought of as similar to energy flow; in fact, it is often useful to look at water and energy flow together when studying desert ecosystems and ecology.

Water availability in deserts may also be hindered by loose sediments. Dust clouds commonly form in windy, arid climates. Scientists have previously theorised that desert dust clouds would enhance rainfall, however, some more recent studies have shown that precipitation is actually inhibited by this phenomenon by absorbing moisture from the atmosphere. This absorption of atmospheric moisture can result in a positive feedback loop, which leads to further desertification.

== Landscape ==
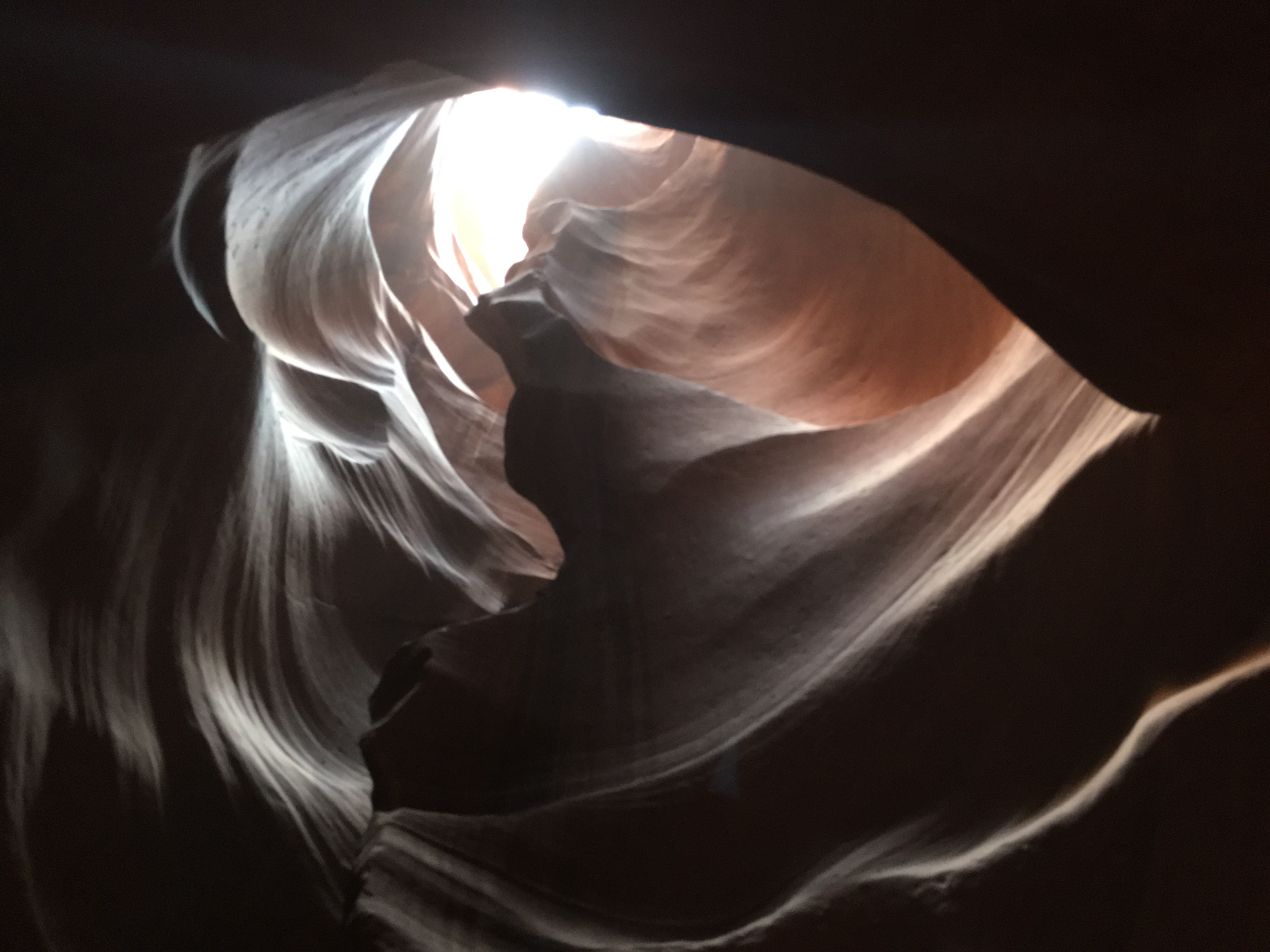
Erosion over time due to wind and rain have created canyons in the landscape. Antelope Canyon, AZ

Desert landscapes can contain a wide variety of geological features, such as oases, rock outcrops, dunes, and mountains. Dunes are structures formed by wind moving sediments into mounds. Desert dunes are generally classified based on their orientation relative to wind direction. Possibly the most recognizable dune type are transverse dunes, characterized by crests transverse to the wind direction. Many dunes are considered to be active, meaning that they can travel and change over time due to the influence of the wind. However, some dunes can be anchored in place by vegetation or topography, preventing their movement. Some dunes may also be referred to as sticky. These types of dunes occur when individual grains of sand become cemented together. Sticky dunes tend to be more stable, and resistant to wind reworking than loose dunes. Barchan, and Seif dunes are among the most common of desert dunes. Barchan dunes are formed as winds continuously blow in the same direction, and are characterized by a crescent-shape atop the dune. Seif dunes are long and narrow, featuring a sharp crest, and are more common in the Sahara Desert.

Analysis of geological features in desert environments can reveal a lot about the geologic history of the area. Through observation and identification of rock deposits, geologists are able to interpret the order of events that occurred during desert formation. For example, research conducted on the surface geology of the Namib Desert allowed geologists to interpret ancient movements of the Kuiseb River on rock ages and features identified in the area.

== Organism adaptation ==
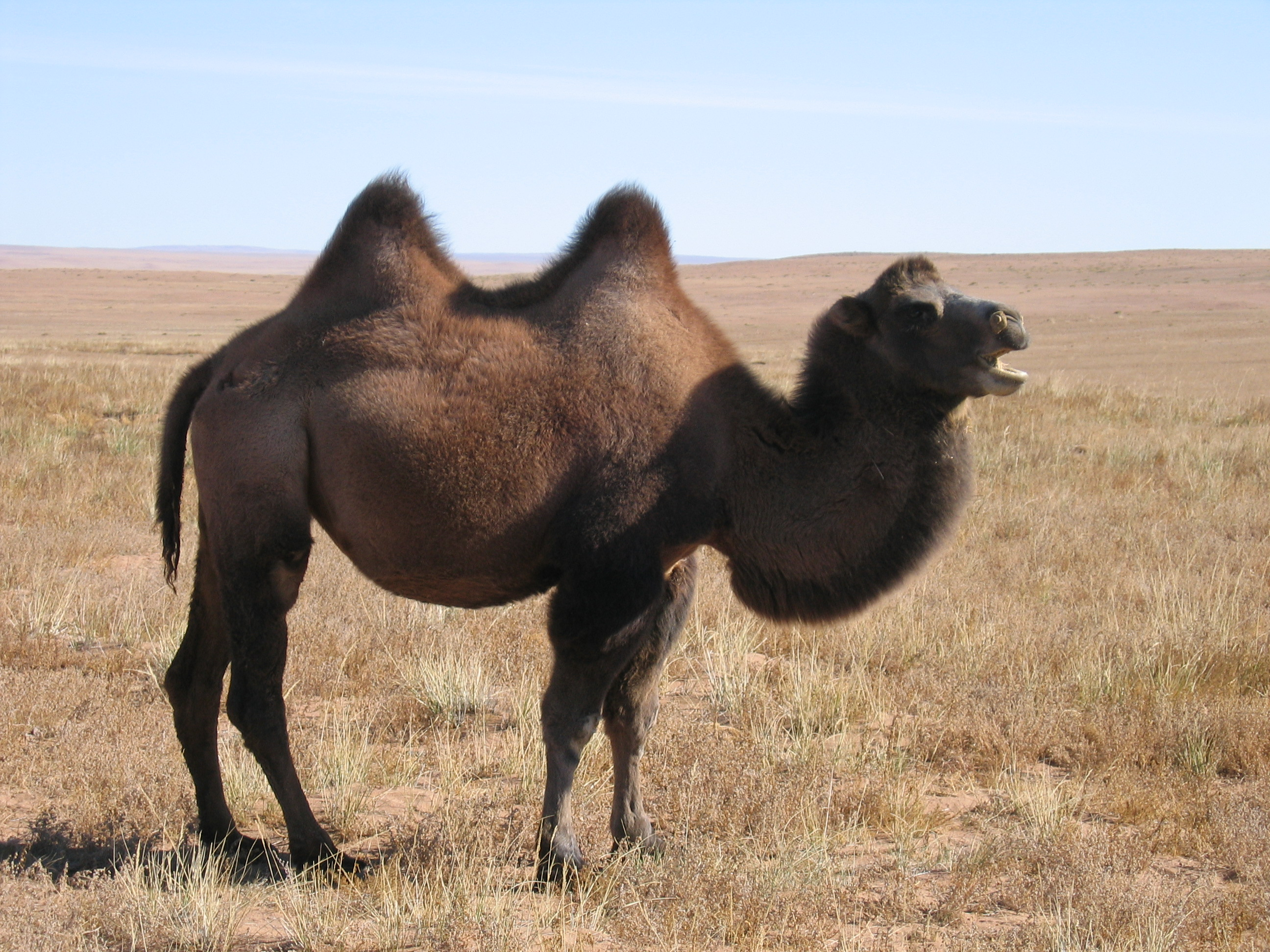
The high body temperatures of bactrian camels allow them to preserve water.

=== Animals ===
Deserts support diverse communities of plants and animals that have evolved resistance, and circumventing methods of extreme temperatures and arid conditions. For example, desert grasslands are more humid and slightly cooler than its surrounding ecosystems. Many animals obtain energy by eating the surrounding vegetation, however, desert plants are much more difficult for organisms to consume. To avoid intense temperatures, the majority of small desert mammals are nocturnal, living in burrows to avoid the intense desert sun during the daytime. These burrows prevent overheating and dehydration as they maintain an optimal temperature for the mammal. Desert ecology is characterized by dry, alkaline soils, low net production and opportunistic feeding patterns by herbivores and carnivores. Other organisms' survival tactics are physiologically based. Such tactics include the completion of life cycles ahead of anticipated drought seasons, and storing water with the help of specialized organs.

Desert climates are particularly demanding on endothermic organisms. However, endothermic organisms have adapted mechanisms to aid in water retention in habitats such as desert ecosystems which are commonly affected by drought. In environments where the external temperature is less than their body temperature, most endotherms are able to balance heat production and heat loss to maintain a comfortable temperature. However, in deserts where air and ground temperatures exceed body temperature, endotherms must be able to dissipate the large amounts of heat being absorbed in these environments. In order to cope with extreme conditions, desert endotherms have adapted through the means of avoidance, relaxation of homeostasis, and specializations. Nocturnal desert rodents, like the kangaroo rat, will spend the daytime in cool burrows deep underground, and emerge at night to seek food. Birds are much more mobile than ground-dwelling endotherms, and can therefore avoid heat-induced dehydration by flying between water sources. To prevent overheating, the body temperatures of many desert mammals have adapted to be much higher than non-desert mammals. Camels, for example, can maintain body temperatures that are about equal to typical desert air temperatures. This adaptation allows camels to retain large amounts of water for extended periods of time. Other examples of higher body temperature in desert mammals include the diurnal antelope ground squirrel, and the oryx. Certain desert endotherms have evolved very specific and unique characteristics to combat dehydration. Male sandgrouse have specialized belly feathers that are able to trap and carry water. This allows the sandgrouse to provide a source of hydration for their chicks, who do not yet have the ability to fly to water sources themselves.

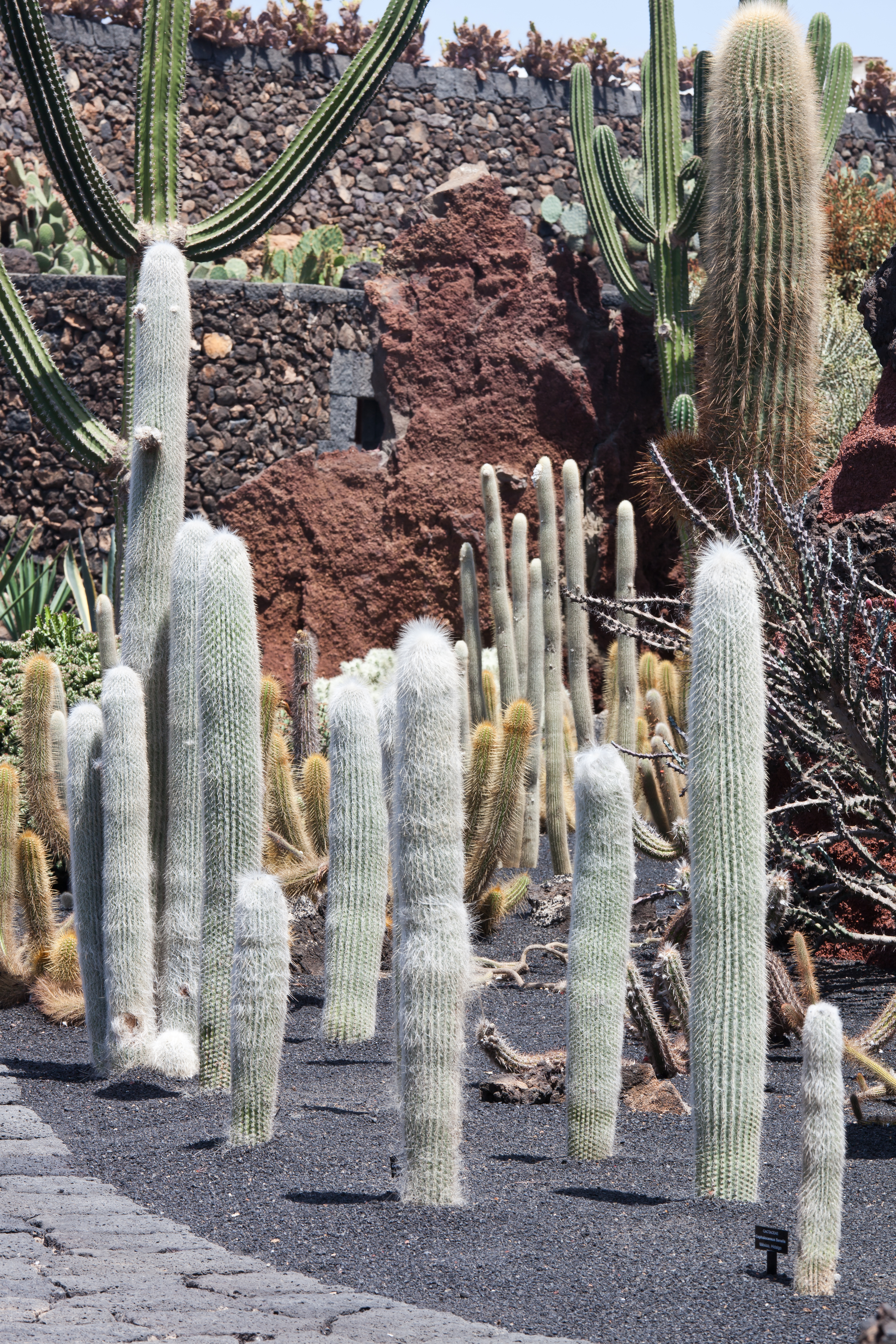
The hairy, white bristles of the old man cactus help deflect strong desert sunlight.

=== Plants ===
Although deserts have severe climates, some plants still manage to grow. Plants that can survive in arid deserts are called xerophytes, meaning they are able to survive long dry periods. Such plants may close their stomata during the daytime and open them again at night. During the night, temperatures are much cooler, and plants will experience less water loss, and intake larger amounts of carbon dioxide for photosynthesis.

Adaptations in xerophytes include resistance to heat and water loss, increased water storage capabilities, and reduced surface area of leaves. One of the most common families of desert plants are the cacti, which are covered in sharp spines or bristles for defence against herbivory. The bristles on certain cacti also have the ability to reflect sunlight, such as those of the old man cactus. Certain xerophytes, like oleander, feature stomata that are recessed as a form of protection against hot, dry desert winds, which allows the leaves to retain water more effectively. Another unique adaptation can be found in xerophytes like ocotillo, which are "leafless during most of the year, thereby avoiding excessive water loss".

There are also plants called phreatophytes which have adapted to the harsh desert conditions by developing extremely long root systems, some of which are 80 ft. long; to reach the water table which ensures a water supply to the plant.

== Exploration and research ==
The harsh climate of most desert regions is a major obstacle in conducting research into these ecosystems. In the environments requiring special adaptations to survive, it is often difficult or even impossible for researchers to spend extended periods of time investigating the ecology of such regions. To overcome the limitations imposed by desert climates, some scientists have used technological advancements in the area of remote sensing and robotics. One such experiment, conducted in 1997, had a specialized robot named Nomad travel through a portion of the Atacama Desert. During this expedition, Nomad travelled over 200 kilometers and provided the researchers with many photographs of sites visited along its path. In another experiment in 2004, named the United Arab Emirates Unified Aerosol Experiment, researchers used satellites and computer models to study emissions and their effect on the climate in the Arabian Desert.

== See also ==
- Aridisols
