= Anthroposol =

Soils modified by humans

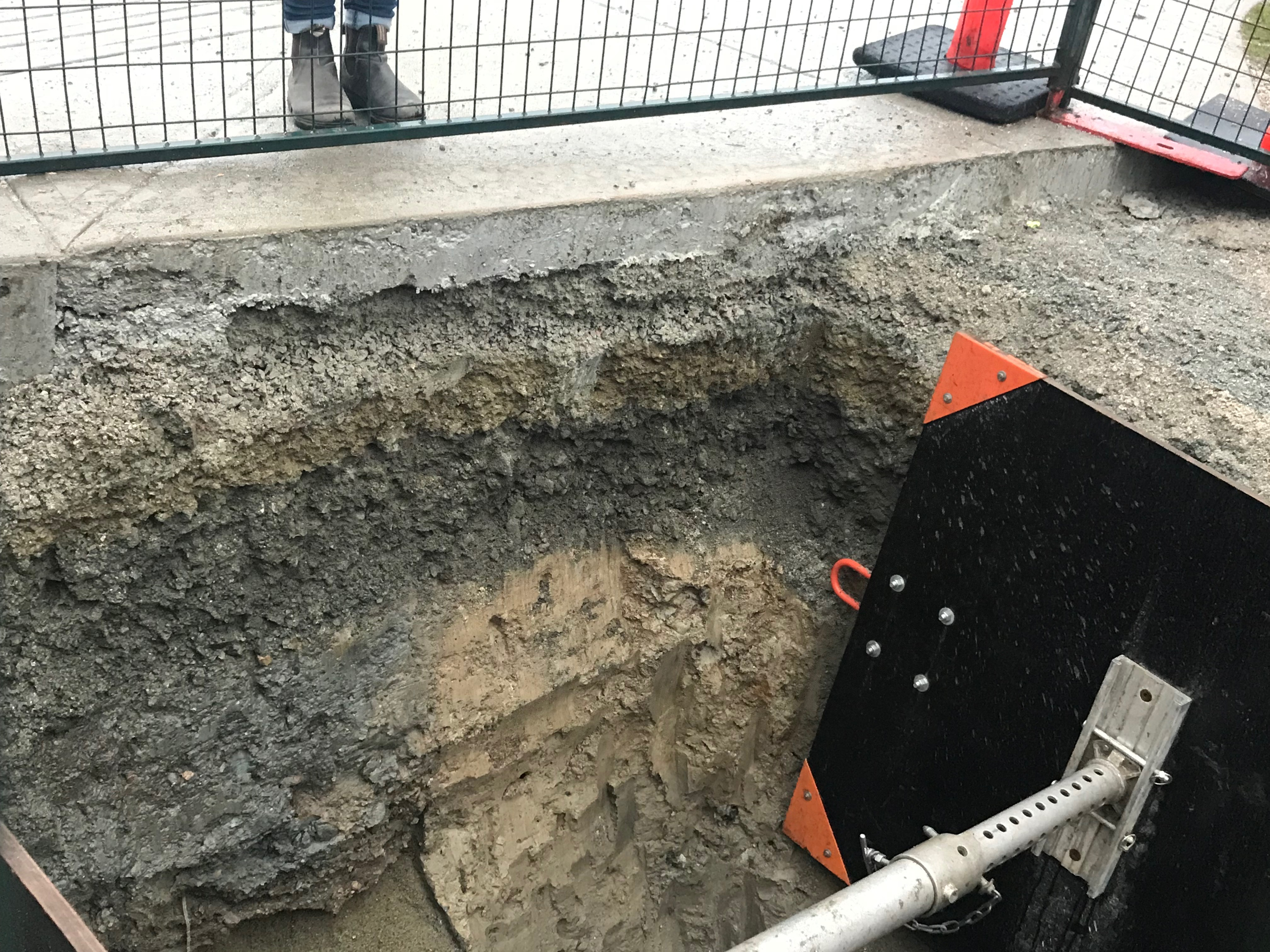
Anthroposol underneath an urban sidewalk

Anthroposols are soils which have been profoundly modified or constructed by humans. They typically have one or more of their natural soil horizons modified, removed or replaced. The word anthroposol is derived from the Greek words anthropos, meaning man and genes meaning caused. Anthroposols are typically found on industrial, commercial, urban and resources extraction sites as well as throughout transportation, fuel and power corridors.

== Classification of anthroposols ==
Soil classification systems are used globally to systematically categorize soils based on diagnostic features or characteristics. Human-formed soils have historically been excluded from soil classification systems due in part to the fact that the criteria used for naturally-formed soils are often not applicable. However, many countries are recognizing their pervasiveness and the need for some type of common language and taxonomy. As of 2016, fifteen countries had added (or proposed adding) anthropogenic soils to their soil classification systems including Brazil, Germany, Canada, Poland and China.

They are known by many terms including: Plaggen soils, Paddy soils, Oasis soils, Terra Preta do Indio (Brazil), Agrozems (Russia), Terrestrische anthropogene Böden (Germany), Anthroposols (Australia and Canada) and Anthrosols (China).

=== World Reference Base for Soil Resources ===
The World Reference Base for Soil Resources (WRB) offers some guidelines for classification. This system is based on a large scale and is not meant to replace national or local systems but rather to facilitate communication between them. The FAO World Soil Resources Report 2006 offers full details. It outlines two larger anthropogenic sub-categories based on the degree of disturbance as well as the pervasiveness of the artifacts within:

- Anthrosol: soils under agricultural cultivation for long periods
- Technosol: soils containing products and artifacts of industrial processes (often toxic). These could include constructed soils used for closure of landfills and mines and soils under pavement.

=== National Soil Classification Systems ===
Each country varies slightly in their diagnostic features and taxonomic structure for soil classification systems as local needs and soil-forming processes are highly variable.

==== France ====
First implemented in 1995, three sub groups are included:

- Transformés: changed by agriculture
- Reconstitutes: for use in agriculture
- Artificiels: urban soils

==== Azerbaijan ====
There are two broader categories within the framework of anthropogenically modified and technogenically disturbed:

- Urbanzems: open and unsealed by paving structures
- Ekranozems: sealed with paving

==== United Kingdom ====
Artificial ground is the term used for anthropogenic soils and is given four classes:

- Made: artificial soils have been placed on top of an existing naturally-formed soil surface
- Worked: naturally-formed soils have been removed
- Infilled: naturally-formed soils have been removed and artificial soil has been added
- Landscaped: extensive remodeling such that one cannot readily distinguish between the areas where the above methods are used

==== Canada ====
As outlined by Naeth et al. (2012) "Anthroposols are azonal soils, highly modified or constructed by human activity, with one or more natural horizons removed, removed and replaced, added to, or significantly modified." The defining features of anthroposols are:

- Soil horizons have been removed, replaced, added to or severely modified by humans
- Manufactured items (artifacts) are present

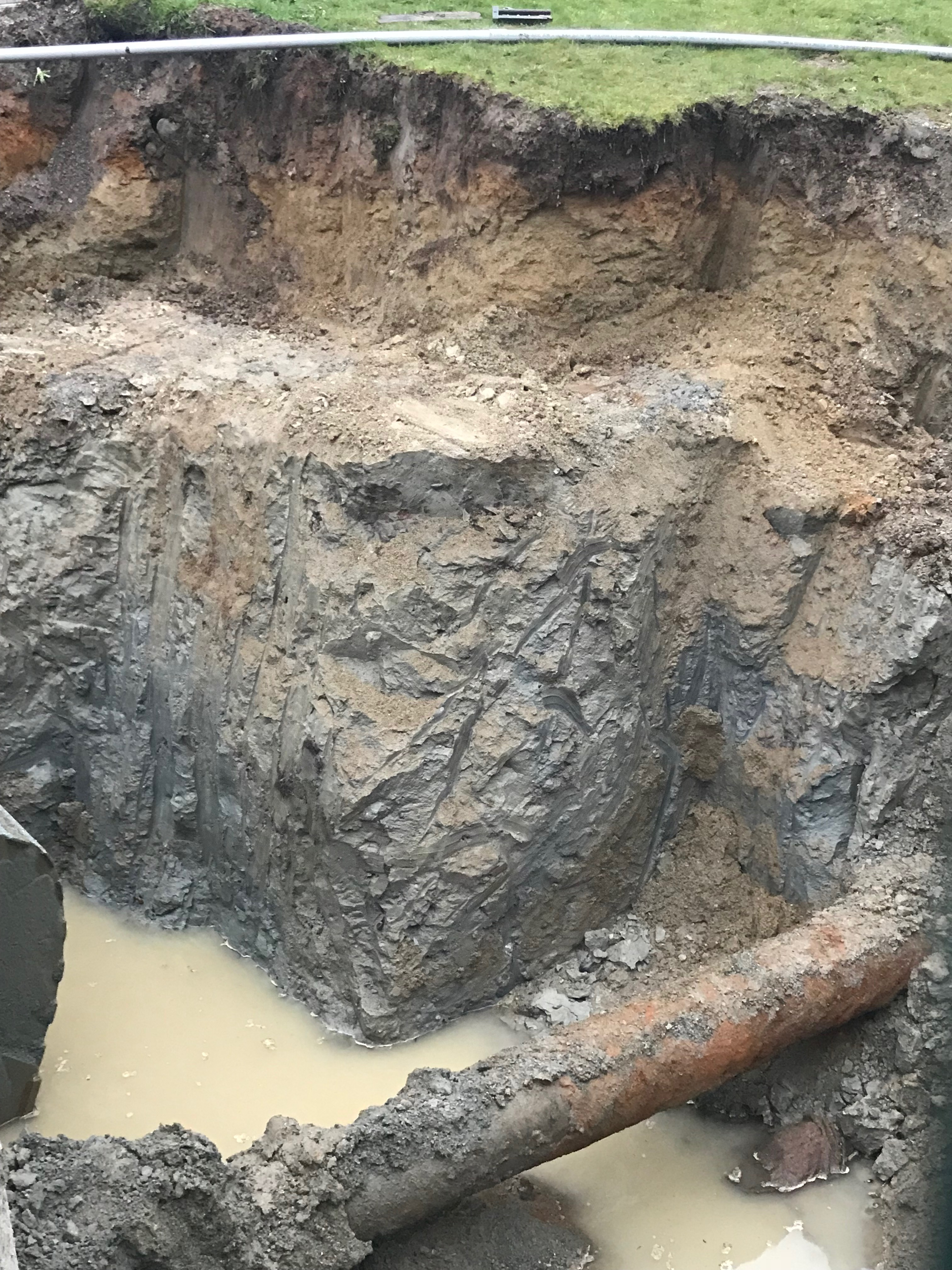
Anthroposol under an urban lawn

A depth of anthropogenic disturbance (of either modification or addition) must be of at least 10 cm above or below the soil surface for a soil to be categorized as an anthroposol. Minimal disturbance would likely still allow the natural soil formation process to be identified.

Tilled soils are not included in the proposed anthroposolic order within the Canadian System of Soil Classification and this disturbance is covered by use of suffix p to indicate a plowed horizon within other soil orders. Anthroposols; however, can occur on agricultural soils when substantial disturbance goes beyond typical tillage (e.g., land levelling that alters natural soil profiles through excavation and burial, pipeline or well construction).

Since anthroposolic soils are commonly developed by human activity with anthropogenic materials, this precludes these soils from classification in the existing classification categories. The first problem is identification of the order for the modified or reconstructed soil, since the existing classification system is applicable only for soils that have been forming under natural conditions. The second problem is determining the most likely trajectory soil development would take.

Proposed categorization within the Canadian System of Soil Classification.

===== Order =====
Anthroposol - "soil that has been visibly disturbed by human activity and that have a D horizon [equal to or greater than] 10 cm thick or have had natural soil horizons removed."

===== Great Group =====
- Technic: a D layer with more than 10% physical artifacts present. If less, move to next two groups
- Spolic: D layer with less than 17% organic carbon
- Carbic: D layer with more than 17% organic carbon

===== Subgroups =====
- Egeo: (latin: to be without) surface layer is less than 10 cm thick
- Albo (latin: white): surface layer more than 10 cm thick with less than 2% carbon
- Fusco (latin: to make dark): surface layer more than 10 cm thick and has 2-17% organic carbon
- Carbo (latin: carbon): has a layer equal to or greater than 10 cm thick with more than 17% organic carbon (but not deep enough to be within the Carbic Great Group)
- Techno (latin: technical or artificial): a layer with more than 10% physical artifacts with a minimum thickness of 10cm (but not deep enough to be within the Technic Great Group)
- Spolo (latin: to strip): a layer with more than 17% organic carbon and a minimum depth of 10cm (but not deep enough to be within the Spolic Great Group)
- Terro (latin: earth): shallow disturbances with at least 10cm of original parent material present.
- Aquo (latin: water): poor drainage (mottles and gleying not needed) evident by saturated soils, a high water table or water-adapted vegetation
- Cryo (greek: kruos - icy cold): permafrost present

Suffixes are used to highlight features of the particular soil. New ones are being created for the anthroposol order. A few examples are:

- q - hydrocarbons present
- w - human-created artifacts present ie. waste
- o - more than 17% organic carbon present

Field testing is currently being done on the new anthroposol classification system for the Canadian soil classification system.
