= Calcisol =

Type of soil containing lime

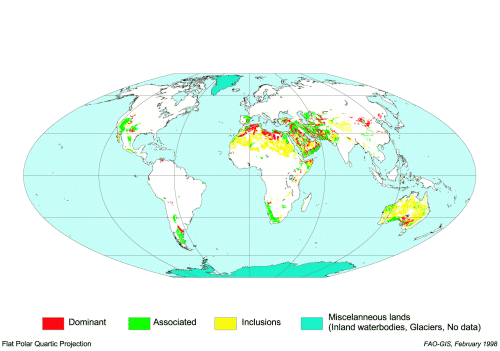
Distribution of Calcisols

A Calcisol in the World Reference Base for Soil Resources (WRB) is a soil with a substantial secondary accumulation of lime. Calcisols are common in calcareous parent materials and widespread in arid and semi-arid environments. Formerly Calcisols were internationally known as Desert soils and Takyrs.

Calcisols are developed in mostly alluvial, colluvial and aeolian deposits of base-rich weathering material. They are found on level to hilly land in arid and semi-arid regions. The natural vegetation is sparse and dominated by xerophytic shrubs and trees and/or ephemeral grasses.

Dryness, and in places also stoniness and/or the presence of a shallow petrocalcic horizon, limit the suitability of Calcisols for agriculture. If irrigated, drained (to prevent salinisation) and fertilised, Calcisols can be highly productive under a wide variety of crops. Hilly areas with Calcisols are predominantly used for low volume grazing of cattle, sheep and goats.

Many Calcisols occur together with Solonchaks that are actually salt-affected Calcisols and/or with other soils with secondary accumulation of lime that do not key out as Calcisols. The total Calcisol area may well amount to some 10 million square kilometres, nearly all of it in the arid and semi-arid subtropics of both hemispheres.

== See also ==
- Pedogenesis
- Pedology (soil study)
- Soil classification
- Calcid
