= Edaphology =

Science concerned with the influence of soils on living beings

Edaphology (from Greek ἔδαφος, edaphos 'ground' + -λογία, -logia) is concerned with the influence of soils on living beings, particularly plants. It is one of two main divisions of soil science, the other being pedology. Edaphology includes the study of how soil influences humankind's use of land for plant growth as well as people's overall use of the land. General subfields within edaphology are agricultural soil science (known by the term agrology in some regions) and environmental soil science. Pedology deals with pedogenesis, soil morphology, and soil classification.

== History ==
The history of edaphology is not simple, as the two main alternative terms for soil science—pedology and edaphology—were initially poorly distinguished. Friedrich Albert Fallou originally conceived pedology in the 19th century as a fundamental science separate from the applied science of agrology, a predecessor term for edaphology, a distinction retained in the current understanding of edaphology. During the 20th century, the term edaphology was "driven out of [pedology-centric] soil science" but remained in use to address edaphic problems in other disciplines. In the case of Russian soil scientists, edaphology was used as an equivalent term to pedology, and in Spain, soil scientists adopted edaphology in preference to the term pedology. In the 21st century, edaphology is recognized by soil scientists as a branch of soil science necessary and complementary to the pedology branch.

Xenophon (431—355 BC), and Cato (234—149 BC), were early edaphologists. Xenophon noted the beneficial effect of turning a cover crop into the earth. Cato wrote De Agri Cultura ("On Farming"), which recommended tillage, crop rotation, and the use of legumes in the rotation to build soil nitrogen. He also devised the first soil capability classification for specific crops.

Jan Baptist van Helmont (1577—1644) performed a famous experiment, growing a willow tree in a pot of soil and supplying only rainwater for five years. The weight gained by the tree exceeded the weight loss of the soil. He concluded that the willow was made of water. Although only partly correct, his experiment reignited interest in edaphology.

== Areas of study ==
=== Agricultural soil science ===
Agricultural soil science is the application of soil chemistry, physics, and biology dealing with the production of crops. In terms of soil chemistry, it places particular emphasis on plant nutrients of importance to farming and horticulture, especially with regard to soil fertility and fertilizer components.

Physical edaphology is strongly associated with crop irrigation and drainage.

Soil husbandry is a strong tradition within agricultural soil science. Beyond preventing soil erosion and degradation in cropland, soil husbandry seeks to sustain the agricultural soil resource though the use of soil conditioners and cover crops.

=== Environmental soil science ===
Environmental soil science studies our interaction with the pedosphere on beyond crop production. Fundamental and applied aspects of the field address vadose zone functions, septic drain field site assessment and function, land treatment of wastewater, stormwater, erosion control, soil contamination with metals and pesticides, remediation of contaminated soils, restoration of wetlands, soil degradation, and environmental nutrient management. It also studies soil in the context of land-use planning, global warming, and acid rain.

== Industrialization and edaphology ==
Industrialization has impacted the way that soil interacts with plants in various ways. Increased mechanical production has led to higher amount of heavy metals within soils. These heavy metals have also been found in crops. While, the increased use of synthetic fertilizer and pesticides has decreased the nutrient availability of soils.

Changes in agricultural practices, such as monocropping and tilling, as a result of industrialization have also impacted aspects of edaphology. Monocropping techniques are efficient for harvesting and business strategies but lead to a decrease in biodiversity. Decreased biodiversity is shown to decrease the nutrients available in soils. Furthermore, monocropping leads to an increased dependency on chemical fertilizer. While intensive tilling disturbs the community of microorganism that live with in soil. These microorganisms help maintain soil moisture and air circulation which are critical to plant growth.

== See also ==
- Soil functions
- Soil zoology
- Sustainable agriculture
