= Unified Soil Classification System =

System describing soil texture and grain size

The Unified Soil Classification System (USCS) is a soil classification system used in engineering and geology to describe the texture and grain size of a soil. The classification system can be applied to most unconsolidated materials, and is represented by a two-letter symbol. Each letter is described below:

First and/or second letters

Letter	Definition
G	gravel
S	sand
M	silt
C	clay
O	organic
PT	peat

Second letter

Letter	Definition
P	poorly graded (many different particle sizes)
W	well-graded (many particle of about the same size)
H	high liquid limit
L	low liquid limit

If the soil has 5–12% by weight of fines passing a #200 sieve (5% < P_{#200} < 12%), both grain size distribution and plasticity have a significant effect on the engineering properties of the soil, and dual notation may be used for the group symbol. For example, GW-GM corresponds to "well-graded gravel with silt."

If the soil has more than 15% by weight retained on a #4 sieve (R_{#4} > 15%), there is a significant amount of gravel, and the suffix "with gravel" may be added to the group name, but the group symbol does not change. For example, SP-SM could refer to "poorly graded SAND with silt" or "poorly graded SAND with silt and gravel."

== Symbol chart ==
Major divisions			Group symbol	Group name
Coarse grained soils more than 50% retained on or above No.200 (0.075 mm) sieve	gravel > 50% of coarse fraction retained on No.4 (4.75 mm) sieve	clean gravel <5% smaller than No.200 Sieve	GW	well-graded gravel, fine to coarse gravel
Coarse grained soils more than 50% retained on or above No.200 (0.075 mm) sieve	gravel > 50% of coarse fraction retained on No.4 (4.75 mm) sieve	clean gravel <5% smaller than No.200 Sieve	GP	poorly graded gravel
Coarse grained soils more than 50% retained on or above No.200 (0.075 mm) sieve	gravel > 50% of coarse fraction retained on No.4 (4.75 mm) sieve	gravel with >12% fines	GM	silty gravel
Coarse grained soils more than 50% retained on or above No.200 (0.075 mm) sieve	gravel > 50% of coarse fraction retained on No.4 (4.75 mm) sieve	gravel with >12% fines	GC	clayey gravel
Coarse grained soils more than 50% retained on or above No.200 (0.075 mm) sieve	sand ≥ 50% of coarse fraction passes No.4 (4.75 mm) sieve	clean sand	SW	well-graded sand, fine to coarse sand
Coarse grained soils more than 50% retained on or above No.200 (0.075 mm) sieve	sand ≥ 50% of coarse fraction passes No.4 (4.75 mm) sieve	clean sand	SP	poorly graded sand
Coarse grained soils more than 50% retained on or above No.200 (0.075 mm) sieve	sand ≥ 50% of coarse fraction passes No.4 (4.75 mm) sieve	sand with >12% fines	SM	silty sand
Coarse grained soils more than 50% retained on or above No.200 (0.075 mm) sieve	sand ≥ 50% of coarse fraction passes No.4 (4.75 mm) sieve	sand with >12% fines	SC	clayey sand
Fine grained soils 50% or more passing the No.200 (0.075 mm) sieve	silt and clay liquid limit < 50	inorganic	ML	silt
Fine grained soils 50% or more passing the No.200 (0.075 mm) sieve	silt and clay liquid limit < 50	inorganic	CL	lean clay
Fine grained soils 50% or more passing the No.200 (0.075 mm) sieve	silt and clay liquid limit < 50	organic	OL	organic silt, organic clay
Fine grained soils 50% or more passing the No.200 (0.075 mm) sieve	silt and clay liquid limit ≥ 50	inorganic	MH	elastic silt
Fine grained soils 50% or more passing the No.200 (0.075 mm) sieve	silt and clay liquid limit ≥ 50	inorganic	CH	fat clay
Fine grained soils 50% or more passing the No.200 (0.075 mm) sieve	silt and clay liquid limit ≥ 50	organic	OH	organic clay, organic silt
Highly organic soils			PT	peat

=== ASTM D-2487 ===
Criteria for Assigning Group Symbols and Group Names Using Laboratory Tests				Soil Classification	
Criteria for Assigning Group Symbols and Group Names Using Laboratory Tests				Group Symbol	Group Name
COARSE-GRAINED SOILS More than 50% retained on No.200 Sieve	Gravels More than 50% of coarse fraction on No. 4 Sieve	Clean Gravels Less than 5% fines	Cu ≥ 4 and 1 ≤ Cc ≤ 3	GW	Well-graded gravel
COARSE-GRAINED SOILS More than 50% retained on No.200 Sieve	Gravels More than 50% of coarse fraction on No. 4 Sieve	Clean Gravels Less than 5% fines	Cu < 4 and/or Cc < 1 or Cc > 3	GP	Poorly graded gravel
COARSE-GRAINED SOILS More than 50% retained on No.200 Sieve	Gravels More than 50% of coarse fraction on No. 4 Sieve	Gravels with Fines More than 12% fines	Fines classify as ML or MH	GM	Silty Gravel
COARSE-GRAINED SOILS More than 50% retained on No.200 Sieve	Gravels More than 50% of coarse fraction on No. 4 Sieve	Gravels with Fines More than 12% fines	Fines classify as CL or CH	GC	Clayey gravel
COARSE-GRAINED SOILS More than 50% retained on No.200 Sieve	Sands 50% or more of coarse fraction passes No.4 sieve	Clean Sands Less than 5% fines	Cu ≥ 6 and 1 ≤ Cc ≤ 3	SW	Well-graded sand
COARSE-GRAINED SOILS More than 50% retained on No.200 Sieve	Sands 50% or more of coarse fraction passes No.4 sieve	Clean Sands Less than 5% fines	Cu < 6 and/or Cc < 1 or Cc > 3	SP	Poorly graded sand
COARSE-GRAINED SOILS More than 50% retained on No.200 Sieve	Sands 50% or more of coarse fraction passes No.4 sieve	Sands with Fines More than 12% fines	Fines classify as ML or MH	SM	Silty sand
COARSE-GRAINED SOILS More than 50% retained on No.200 Sieve	Sands 50% or more of coarse fraction passes No.4 sieve	Sands with Fines More than 12% fines	Fines classify as CL or CH	SC	Clayey sand
FINE-GRAINED SOILS 50% or more passes the no. 200 Sieve	Silts and Clays Liquid limit less than 50	Inorganic	PI > 7 and plots on or above "A" line	CL	Lean clay
FINE-GRAINED SOILS 50% or more passes the no. 200 Sieve	Silts and Clays Liquid limit less than 50	Inorganic	PI < 4 and plots below "A" line	ML	Silt
FINE-GRAINED SOILS 50% or more passes the no. 200 Sieve	Silts and Clays Liquid limit less than 50	Organic	Liquid limit—oven dried < 0.75	OL	Organic clay
FINE-GRAINED SOILS 50% or more passes the no. 200 Sieve	Silts and Clays Liquid limit less than 50	Organic	Liquid limit—not dried	OL	Organic silt
FINE-GRAINED SOILS 50% or more passes the no. 200 Sieve	Silts and Clays Liquid limit 50 or more	Inorganic	PI plots on or above "A" line	CH	Fat clay
FINE-GRAINED SOILS 50% or more passes the no. 200 Sieve	Silts and Clays Liquid limit 50 or more	Inorganic	PI plots below "A" line	MH	Elastic silt
FINE-GRAINED SOILS 50% or more passes the no. 200 Sieve	Silts and Clays Liquid limit 50 or more	Organic	Liquid limit—oven dried < 0.75	OH	Organic clay
FINE-GRAINED SOILS 50% or more passes the no. 200 Sieve	Silts and Clays Liquid limit 50 or more	Organic	Liquid limit - not dried	OH	Organic silt
HIGHLY ORGANIC SOILS				PT	Peat

== See also ==
- AASHTO Soil Classification System
- AASHTO
- ASTM International
- USDA Soil Taxonomy (Soil classification for agricultural purposes)
