= Pedosphere =

Outermost layer of the Earth

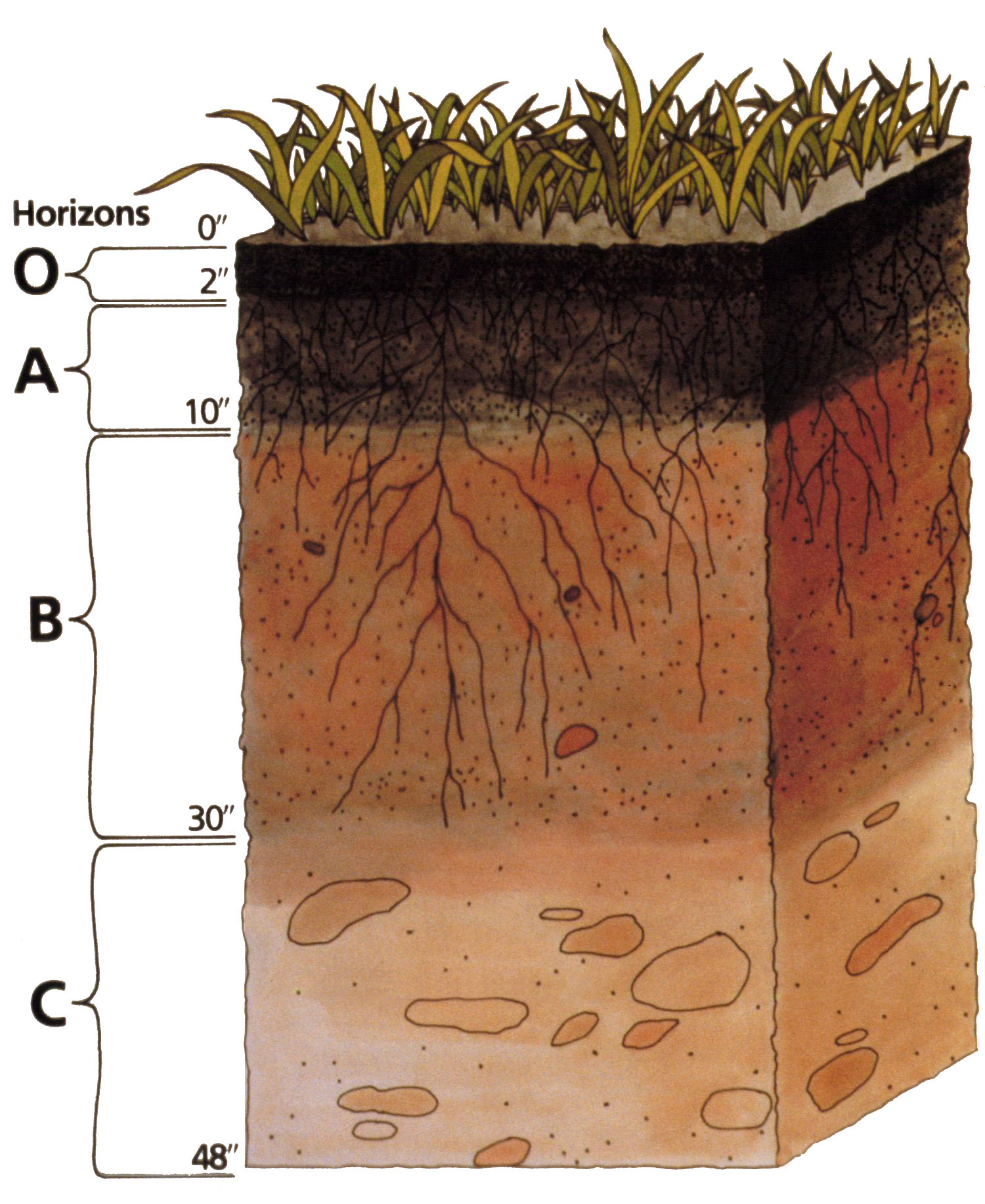
Cross-section illustrating the soil layer, showing the topsoil (A); regolith (B); and saprolite, a less-weathered regolith (C).

The pedosphere (from Ancient Greek πέδον (pédon) 'ground, earth' and σφαῖρα (sphaîra) 'sphere') is the outermost layer of the Earth's crust that is composed of soil and subject to soil formation and erosion processes. It exists at the interface of the lithosphere, atmosphere, hydrosphere and biosphere. The pedosphere is the "stratum corneum" of the Earth's surface and only develops when there is a dynamic interaction between the atmosphere (air in and above the soil), biosphere (living organisms and associated organic matters), lithosphere (unconsolidated regolith and consolidated bedrock) and the hydrosphere (water in, on and below the soil). The pedosphere is the foundation of terrestrial ecosystems on Earth.

The pedosphere acts as the mediator of chemical and biogeochemical flux into and out of these respective systems and is made up of gaseous, mineralic, fluid and biologic components. The pedosphere lies within the Critical Zone, a broader interface that includes vegetation, pedosphere, aquifer systems, regolith and finally ends at some depth in the bedrock where the biosphere and hydrosphere cease to make significant changes to the chemistry at depth. As part of the larger global system, any particular environment in which soil forms is influenced solely by its geographic position on the globe as climatic, geologic, biologic and anthropogenic changes occur with changes in longitude and latitude.

The pedosphere lies below the vegetative cover of the biosphere and above the hydrosphere and lithosphere. The soil forming process (pedogenesis) can begin without the aid of biology but is significantly quickened in the presence of biologic reactions, where it forms a soil carbon sponge. Soil formation begins with the chemical and/or physical breakdown of minerals to form the initial material that overlies the bedrock substrate. Biology quickens this by secreting acidic compounds that help break rock apart. Particular biologic pioneers are lichen, mosses and seed bearing plants, but many other inorganic reactions take place that diversify the chemical makeup of the early soil layer. Once weathering and decomposition products accumulate, a coherent soil body allows the migration of fluids both vertically and laterally through the soil profile, causing ion exchange between solid, fluid and gaseous phases. As time progresses, the bulk geochemistry of the soil layer will deviate away from the initial composition of the bedrock and will evolve to a chemistry that reflects the type of reactions that take place in the soil.

== Lithosphere ==
The primary conditions for soil development are controlled by the chemical composition of the rock on which the soil will be. Rock types that form the base of the soil profile are often either sedimentary (carbonate or siliceous), igneous or metaigneous (metamorphosed igneous rocks) or volcanic and metavolcanic rocks. The rock type and the processes that lead to its exposure at the surface are controlled by the regional geologic setting of the specific area under study, which revolve around the underlying theory of plate tectonics, subsequent deformation, uplift, subsidence and deposition.

Metaigneous and metavolcanic rocks form the largest component of cratons and are high in silica. Igneous and volcanic rocks are also high in silica, but with non-metamorphosed rock, weathering becomes faster and the mobilization of ions is more widespread. Rocks high in silica produce silicic acid as a weathering product. There are few rock types that lead to localized enrichment of some of the biologically limiting elements like phosphorus (P) and nitrogen (N). Phosphatic shale (< 15% P_{2}O_{5}) and phosphorite (> 15% P_{2}O_{5}) form in anoxic deep water basins that preserve organic material. Greenstone (metabasalt), phyllite, and schist release up to 30–50% of the nitrogen pool. Thick successions of carbonate rocks are often deposited on craton margins during sea level rise. The widespread dissolution of carbonate and evaporites leads to elevated levels of Mg^{2+}, HCO^{−}_{3}, Sr^{2+}, Na^{+}, Cl^{−} and SO^{2−}_{4} ions in aqueous solution.

== Weathering and dissolution of minerals ==
The process of soil formation is dominated by chemical weathering of silicate minerals, aided by acidic products of pioneering plants and organisms as well as carbonic acid inputs from the atmosphere. Carbonic acid is produced in the atmosphere and soil layers through the carbonation reaction.

H_{2}O + CO_{2} ⇌ H^{+} + HCO_{3}^{−} H_{2}CO_{3}

This is the dominant form of chemical weathering and aides in the breakdown of carbonate minerals (such as calcite and dolomite) and silicate minerals (such as feldspar). The breakdown of the Na-feldspar, albite, by carbonic acid to form kaolinite clay is as follows:

2 NaAlSi_{3}O_{8} + 2 H_{2}CO_{3} + 9 H_{2}O ⇌ 2 Na^{+} + 2 HCO_{3}^{−} + 4 H_{4}SiO_{4} + Al_{2}Si_{2}O_{5}(OH)_{4}

Evidence of this reaction in the field would be elevated levels of bicarbonate (HCO^{−}_{3}), sodium and silica ions in the water runoff.

The breakdown of carbonate minerals:

CaCO_{3} + H_{2}CO_{3} ⇌ Ca^{2+} + 2 HCO_{3}^{−}
CaCO_{3} ⇌ Ca^{2+} + CO_{3}^{2−}

The further dissolution of carbonic acid (H_{2}CO_{3}) and bicarbonate (HCO^{−}_{3}) produces CO_{2} gas. Oxidization is also a major contributor to the breakdown of many silicate minerals and formation of secondary minerals (diagenesis) in the early soil profile. Oxidation of olivine (FeMgSiO_{4}) releases Fe, Mg and Si ions. The Mg is soluble in water and is carried in the runoff, but the Fe often reacts with oxygen to precipitate Fe_{2}O_{3} (hematite), the oxidized state of iron oxide. Sulfur, a byproduct of decaying organic material, will also react with iron to form pyrite (FeS_{2}) in reducing environments. Pyrite dissolution leads to low pH levels due to elevated H^{+} ions and further precipitation of Fe_{2}O_{3} ultimately changing the redox conditions of the environment.

== Biosphere ==
Inputs from the biosphere may begin with lichen and other microorganisms that secrete oxalic acid. These microorganisms, associated with the lichen community or independently inhabiting rocks, include blue-green algae, green algae, various fungi, and numerous bacteria. Lichen has long been viewed as the pioneers of soil development as the following 1997 Isozaki statement suggests:

The initial conversion of rock into soil is carried on by the pioneer lichens and their successors, the mosses, in which the hair-like rhizoids assume the role of roots in breaking down the surface into fine dust.

However, lichens are not necessarily the only pioneering organisms nor the earliest form of soil formation as it has been documented that seed-bearing plants may occupy an area and colonize quicker than lichen. Also, eolian sedimentation (wind generated) can produce high rates of sediment accumulation. Nonetheless, lichen can certainly withstand harsher conditions than most vascular plants, and although they have slower colonization rates, they do form the dominant group in alpine regions.

Organic acids released from plant roots include acetic acid and citric acid. During the decay of organic matter phenolic acids are released from plant matter and humic acid and fulvic acid are released by soil microbes. These organic acids speed up chemical weathering by combining with some of the weathering products in a process known as chelation. In the soil profile, these organic acids are often concentrated at the top of the profile, while carbonic acid plays a larger role towards the bottom of the profile or below in the aquifer.

As the soil column develops further into thicker accumulations, larger animals come to inhabit the soil and continue to alter the chemical evolution of their respective niche. Earthworms aerate the soil and convert large amounts of organic matter into rich humus, improving soil fertility. Small burrowing mammals store food, grow young and may hibernate in the pedosphere altering the course of soil evolution. Large mammalian herbivores above ground transport nutrients in form of nitrogen-rich waste and phosphorus-rich antlers, while predators leave phosphorus-rich piles of bones on the soil surface, leading to localized enrichment of the soil.

== Redox conditions in wetland soils ==
Nutrient cycling in lakes and freshwater wetlands depends heavily on redox conditions. Under a few millimeters of water, heterotrophic bacteria metabolize and consume oxygen. They therefore deplete the soil of oxygen and create the need for anaerobic respiration. Some anaerobic microbial processes include denitrification, sulfate reduction and methanogenesis and are responsible for the release of N_{2} (nitrogen), H_{2}S (hydrogen sulfide) and CH_{4} (methane). Other anaerobic microbial processes are linked to changes in the oxidation state of iron and manganese. As a result of anaerobic decomposition, the soil stores large amounts of organic carbon because the soil carbon sponge stays intact.

The reduction potential describes which way chemical reactions will proceed in oxygen deficient soils and controls the nutrient cycling in flooded systems. Reduction potential is used to express the likelihood of an environment to receive electrons and therefore become reduced. For example, if a system already has plenty of electrons (anoxic, organic-rich shale) it is reduced. In a system, it will likely donate electrons to a part that has a low concentration of electrons, or an oxidized environment, to equilibrate to the chemical gradient. An oxidized environment has high redox potential, whereas a reduced environment has a low redox potential.

The redox potential is controlled by the oxidation state of the chemical species, pH and the amount of O_{2} there is in the system. The oxidizing environment accepts electrons because of the presence of O_{2}, which acts as an electron acceptor:

O_{2} + 4 e^{−} + 4 H^{+} ⇌ 2 H_{2}O

This equation will tend to move to the right in acidic conditions. Higher redox potentials are found at lower pH levels. Bacteria, heterotrophic organisms, consume oxygen while decomposing organic material. This depletes the soils of oxygen, thus decreasing the redox potential. At high redox potential, the oxidized form of iron, ferric iron (Fe^{3+}), will be deposited commonly as hematite. In low redox conditions, decomposition rates decrease and the deposition of ferrous iron (Fe^{2+}) increase.

By using analytical geochemical tools such as X-ray fluorescence or inductively coupled mass spectrometry the two forms of Fe (Fe^{2+} and Fe^{3+}) can be measured in ancient rocks therefore determining the redox potential for ancient soils. Such a study was done on Permian through Triassic rocks (300–200 million years old) in Japan and British Columbia. The geologists found hematite throughout the early and middle Permian but began to find the reduced form of iron in pyrite within the ancient soils near the end of the Permian and into the Triassic. These results suggest that conditions became less oxygen rich, even anoxic, during the late Permian, which eventually led to the greatest extinction in Earth’s history, the P-T extinction.

Decomposition in anoxic or reduced soils is also carried out by sulfur-reducing bacteria which, instead of O_{2} use SO^{2−}_{4} as an electron acceptor and produce hydrogen sulfide (H_{2}S) and carbon dioxide in the process:

2 H^{+} + SO_{4}^{2−} + 2 [CH_{2}O] ⇄ 2 CO_{2} + H_{2}S + 2 H_{2}O

The H_{2}S gas percolates upwards and reacts with Fe^{2+} and precipitates pyrite, acting as a trap for the toxic H_{2}S gas. However, H_{2}S is still a large fraction of emissions from wetland soils. In most freshwater wetlands there is little sulfate (SO^{2−}_{4}) so methanogenesis becomes the dominant form of decomposition by methanogenic bacteria only when sulfate is depleted. Acetate, a compound that is a byproduct of fermenting cellulose is split by methanogenic bacteria to produce methane (CH_{4}) and carbon dioxide (CO_{2}), which are released to the atmosphere. Methane is also released during the reduction of CO_{2} by the same bacteria.

== Atmosphere ==
In the pedosphere it is safe to assume that gases are in equilibrium with the atmosphere. Because plant roots and soil microbes release CO_{2} to the soil, the concentration of bicarbonate (HCO^{−}_{3}) in soil waters is much greater than that in equilibrium with the atmosphere, the high concentration of CO_{2} and the occurrence of metals in soil solutions results in lower pH levels in the soil. Gases that escape from the pedosphere to the atmosphere include the gaseous byproducts of carbonate dissolution, decomposition, redox reactions and microbial photosynthesis. The main inputs from the atmosphere are aeolian sedimentation, rainfall and gas diffusion. Eolian sedimentation includes anything that can be entrained by wind or that stays suspended in air and includes a wide variety of aerosol particles, biological particles like pollen, and dust particles. Nitrogen is the most abundant constituent in rain (after water), as water vapor utilizes aerosol particles to nucleate rain droplets.

== Soil in forests ==
Soil is well developed in the forest as suggested by the thick humus layers, rich diversity of large trees and animals that live there. Forest soils can form a thick soil carbon sponge. In forests, precipitation exceeds evapotranspiration which results in an excess of water that percolates downward through the soil layers. Slow rates of decomposition leads to large amounts of fulvic acid, greatly enhancing chemical weathering. The downward percolation, in conjunction with chemical weathering leaches Mg, Fe, and aluminium (Al) from the soil and transports them downward, a process known as podzolization. This process leads to marked contrasts in the appearance and chemistry of the soil layers.

== Soil in the tropics ==
Tropical forests receive more insolation and rainfall over longer growing seasons than any other environment on earth. With these elevated temperatures, insolation and rainfall, biomass is extremely productive leading to the production of as much as 800 grams of carbon per square meter per year (8 tons of C/hectare/year). Higher temperatures and larger amounts of water contribute to higher rates of chemical weathering. Increased rates of decomposition cause smaller amounts of fulvic acid to percolate and leach metals from the zone of active weathering. Thus, in stark contrast to soil in temperate forests, tropical forests have little to no podzolization and therefore do not have marked visual and chemical contrasts with the soil layers. Instead, the mobile metals Mg, Fe and Al are precipitated as oxide minerals giving the soil a rusty red color.

== Soil in grasslands and deserts ==
Precipitation in grasslands is equal to or less than evapotranspiration and causes soil development to operate in relative drought. Leaching and migration of weathering products is therefore decreased. Large amounts of evaporation cause a buildup of calcium (Ca), and other large cations flocculate clay minerals and fulvic acids in the upper soil profile. Low amounts of precipitation and high levels of evapotranspiration limit the downward percolation of water and organic acids, reducing chemical weathering and soil development. The depth to the maximum concentration of clay increases in areas of increased precipitation and leaching. When leaching is decreased, the calcium precipitates as calcite (CaCO_{3}) in the lower soil levels, a layer known as caliche.

Deserts behave similarly to grasslands but operate in constant drought as precipitation is less than evapotranspiration. Chemical weathering proceeds more slowly than in grasslands and beneath the caliche layer may be a layer of gypsum and halite. To study soils in deserts, pedologists have used the concept of chronosequences to relate the timing and development of the soil layers. It has been shown that phosphorus leaches very quickly from the system, and soil P-levels decrease with age. Furthermore, carbon buildup in the soils is decreased due to slower decomposition rates. As a result, the rates of carbon circulation in the biogeochemical cycle is decreased.
