= The Future of Food =

- DVD cover art
- Directed by: Deborah Koons Garcia
- Written by: Deborah Koons Garcia
- Produced by: Catherine Lynn Butler; Deborah Koons Garcia
- Starring: Dr. Charles M. Benbrook; Ignacio Chapela; Percy Schmeiser; Exequiel Ezcurra
- Narrated by: Sara Maamouri
- Cinematography: John Chater
- Edited by: Vivien Hillgrove
- Music by: Todd Boekelheide
- Production company: Lily Films
- Distributed by: Cinema Libre Studio; (2005 theatrical); Morgan Spurlock Presents; (DVD)
- Release date: May 30, 2004 (United States)
- Running time: 88 minutes
- Country: United States
- Languages: English; Spanish
- Budget: $750,000 (est)

You may also be looking for Future food technology.

The Future of Food is a 2004 American documentary film written and directed by Deborah Koons Garcia to describe an investigation into unlabeled, patented, genetically engineered foods sold in grocery stores in the United States for the past decade. In addition to the US, there is a focus on Canada and Mexico.

== Synopsis ==
The films voices opinions of farmers in disagreement with the food industry, and details the impacts on their lives and livelihoods from this new technology, and the market and political forces that are changing what people eat. The farmers state that they are held legally responsible for their crops being invaded by "company-owned" genes. The film generally opposes the patenting of living organisms, and describes the disappearance of traditional cultural practices.

It also criticizes the cost of a globalized food industry on human lives around the world. It states that international companies are gradually driving farmers off their land in many countries, that monoculture farming might lead to global dependence of the human race on food corporations, and that there is an increased risk of ecological disasters caused by a reduction of biological diversity. For example, the local varieties of Mexican corn are being replaced by subsidized US corn.

The film also describes a fear of major losses to local food systems and states that these gene banks will no longer be available to save global industrial agriculture when a new pest arises, and that if they spread to plants in the wild, terminator genes could lead to a widespread catastrophe affecting the food supply. Legal stories reported by the film related how a number of farmers in North America have been sued by the Monsanto Company.

== Cast ==
interviewees

- Dr. Charles M. Benbrook as himself, former Director of National Academy of Sciences' Board on Agriculture
- Ignacio Chapela as himself, microbial ecologist at University of California Berkeley
- Exequiel Ezcurra as himself, Director of National Institute of Ecology, Mexico
- Louise Gale as herself, Greenpeace International
- Dave Henson as himself, founder, Program on Corporation, Law and Democracy
- Andrew Kimbrell as himself, executive director, Center for Food Safety
- Percy Schmeiser as himself
- Louise Schmeiser as herself
- Fred Kirschenmann as himself, director of The Leopold Center for Sustainable Agriculture
- Marc Loiselle as himself
- Paul Muller as himself
- Rodney Nelson as himself
- Darrin Qualman as himself, National Farmers Union, Canada
- Judith Redmond as herself,
- Jorge Soberon as himself, director, National Commission of Bio Safety, Mexico
- Terry Zakreski as himself, attorney for Percy Schmeiser

archive footage

- George W. Bush as himself
- Dan Quayle as himself, Vice President & Chair of Council on Competitiveness
- Grace Booth as herself, Allergic to Genetically Modified Corn

== Production ==

The film was written and directed by Deborah Koons Garcia, produced by Catherine Butler and Koons Garcia, and premiered on September 14, 2005 at Film Forum in New York City to a full house. It has since been released on DVD in both NTSC and PAL formats.

== Reception ==
=== Critical response ===
On Rotten Tomatoes the film has a score of 81% based on reviews from 26 critics. The websites consensus states: "The Future of Food is a one-sided, but revelatory documentary about the dangers of genetically modified food."

Wesley Morris of The Boston Globe made a tongue-in-cheek comparison to the horror genre by writing "Anyone looking for a more practical horror film than The Fog should try The Future of Food, a new documentary about the slippery slope of genetic modification in agriculture", and shared that in 1998 Monsanto publicly abrogated any responsibility for ensuring the long-term safety of their GMO products and passed that responsibility to the Food and Drug Administration.

Variety wrote that the film "is a disturbing—if somewhat bland and partisan—study of agribusiness' aggressive push for genetically-modified food," and expressed "it's a shame writer-director Deborah Koons Garcia opts to show only one side of the argument". They also felt that seen as "a rallying cry for organic and slow-food fans everywhere", the film would find a large audience "in public interest tube play and activist vid circulation."

Stephen Holden of The New York Times called the film a "sober, far-reaching polemic against genetically modified foods".

The Georgia Straight speaks toward Deborah Koons-Garcia's advocacy and her opposition to the genetic engineering done by Monsanto. While noting the film's beginning awkwardly with Koons-Garcia's pointing the finger of shame at the political motivation of Monsanto, they concluded it "gets slightly more hopeful as it goes along".

San Francisco Chronicle wrote the filmmaker "has taken a complex subject and made it digestible for anyone who cares about what they put into their stomachs," but also noted that "Monsanto will attack Garcia's documentary as a piece of unbalanced journalism".

Victoria Gilman of Chemical & Engineering News criticized the lack of balance in the film, noting that Garcia defended farmers being deprived of the ability to raise non-GMO canola oil despite canola oil itself being a creation of a sort of "genetic engineering" (not to be confused with GM technologies) using the science at the time.

New York Post called the film "enlightening", noting it "takes dead aim at genetically altered food, [by] arguing that grocery shelves are filled with potentially dangerous items."

New York Daily Newsgave the film 3 stars and spoke toward the film's tone, writing "Garcia's somber narration is a turnoff, but this plucky little diatribe gets you thinking about the larger implications facing future generations".

The Hollywood Reporter wrote the film "is a powerful, if one-sided, attack on the GM food industry," because the filmmaker "builds a strong case against GM food and its producers", but a "major weakness is that the GM producers are not given time to explain their side of the story."

Seattle Times noted that the film used "every propagandist trick in the book", supported by "foreboding background music", and a "relentlessly downbeat tone and gloom-and-doom hand-wringing over the way corporate greed is poisoning the globe" to force their point across, and wrote "Most of us have some awareness about the debate over genetically engineered food. But it's a good bet that far fewer people know how insidious these possibly dangerous man-made organisms have become as their invasion into the world's food supply grows".

The Denver Post referred to the film as a "propaganda documentary", and commented that while the film's concept had great possibilities with hopes that it would "become a worthy champion of the little guy" in its covering of Percy Schmeiser's battle with Monsanto, the film failed because "filmmaker Deborah Koons Garcia isn't much of a journalist" and she "strays from this fascinating case to a generalized attack on biotechnology and corporate farming", through using "loose accusations and emotionally dishonest footage to argue her cause".

=== Awards and nominations ===
- 2005, won WFCC award as 'Best Documentary: Above and Beyond' by Women Film Critics Circle
- 2005, won Audience Award as 'Best Documentary Film' at Ashland Independent Film Festival

== See also ==
- Animal, Vegetable, Miracle: A Year of Food Life
- The Jungle
- A Place at the Table
- Food, Inc.
