= Dennis Keeney =

American scientist

Dennis R. Keeney
- Born: July 2, 1937 (age 89)
- Citizenship: American
- Education: Iowa State University (ISU)
- Known for: First Director of the Leopold Center for Sustainable Agriculture at ISU, Ames, IA
- Scientific career
- Fields: agronomy, soil science, water chemistry

Dennis R. Keeney (born July 2, 1937) is an American scientist in soil science and water chemistry. He was the first director of the Leopold Center for Sustainable Agriculture in Ames, Iowa. He served as president of the Soil Science Society of America and the American Society of Agronomy. In 2000, he was awarded the Charles A. Black Award by the Council for Agricultural Science and Technology (CAST).

== Early life and education ==
Keeney grew up on his family's dairy farm near Runnells, Iowa not far from Des Moines.

He graduated from Iowa State University (ISU) with a B.S. in agronomy. He studied soil science at University of Wisconsin and obtained an M.S., followed by a Ph.D. in agronomy and biochemistry from Iowa State University.

== Career ==
Keeney became a professor of agronomy, and stayed on as faculty member in soils and water chemistry for more than 20 years.

In 1987, the Leopold Center for Sustainable Agriculture was established at ISU, and in 1988 he became its first director. The Leopold Center developed research studies and teaching about the environmental impacts of farming, sustainable agriculture, preservation of natural resources, including soil and water quality, and rural community development. Keeney defined sustainable agriculture as

"It means using the resources we have wisely. Probably number one to conserve the soil resource, the water resource, and the land resource. It's a Leopold concept really, because Leopold talked about land as the water, the air, the soil, and the animals living on it."

Already in 1988 Keeney examined the energy balance of ethanol fuel as a "renewable" fuel and concluded, that more energy was required to produce ethanol than was retrieved from it then. Keeney retired from the Leopold Center in 1999. He was succeeded by Fred Kirschenmann.

With the corn ethanol industry rapidly expanding between 2000 and 2005, in what Keeney called "...an "irrational exuberance" trip with biofuels" he was one of few Iowa scientists looking at water consumption. In 2009, Keeney published his latest peer-reviewed paper on the "Environmental, social, economic, and food issues brought on by the rapidly expanding ethanol-from-corn industry in the United States". As of 2014 he has continued to publicly question its benefits.

He was president of the Soil Science Society of America in 1988 and the American Society of Agronomy in 1993. In 1998, he was awarded the Charles A. Black Award by the Council for Agricultural Science and Technology (CAST).

As of 2015 he consults as a Senior Fellow for the Institute for Agriculture and Trade Policy in Minneapolis and the Department of Soil, Air and Water at the University of Minnesota. He is a visiting scholar for the Center for a Livable Future, Johns Hopkins University.

In February 2015 his memoir “The Keeney Place: A Life in the Heartland” was published after nine years of work.

== Selected publications ==
Keeney has published over 140 peer reviewed papers on soil and water quality research.

- Dennis Keeney “The Keeney Place: A Life in the Heartland”, Levins Publishing. 110 pages. Website: thekeeneyplace.com
- Nitrogen and the Mississippi September 11, 2000, IATP
- Nitrogen and the Upper Mississippi River March 17, 2002, IATP
- Testimony to the US Commission on Ocean Policy, September 30, 2002
- The New Road April 15, 2003
- Genetically Modified Crops and Integrated Pest Management adoption April 15, 2003
- Shallow Water October 12, 2003
- Performance Based Approach to Control of Agricultural Non Point Source Pollution October 20, 2003
- Our fragile food supply September 2, 2004
- Reducing Nutrients in the Mississippi River and the Gulf of Mexico December 14, 2006
- Biofuel and Global Biodiversity May 5, 2008
- Agriculture Sustainability February 28, 2010
- Colonialism is not dead March 21, 2010
- Drought in my life August 6, 2012
- Resiliency, agriculture and the 2012 drought August 14, 2012
