= Cheryl Palm =

American agricultural scientist (1954–2024)

Cheryl Ann Palm
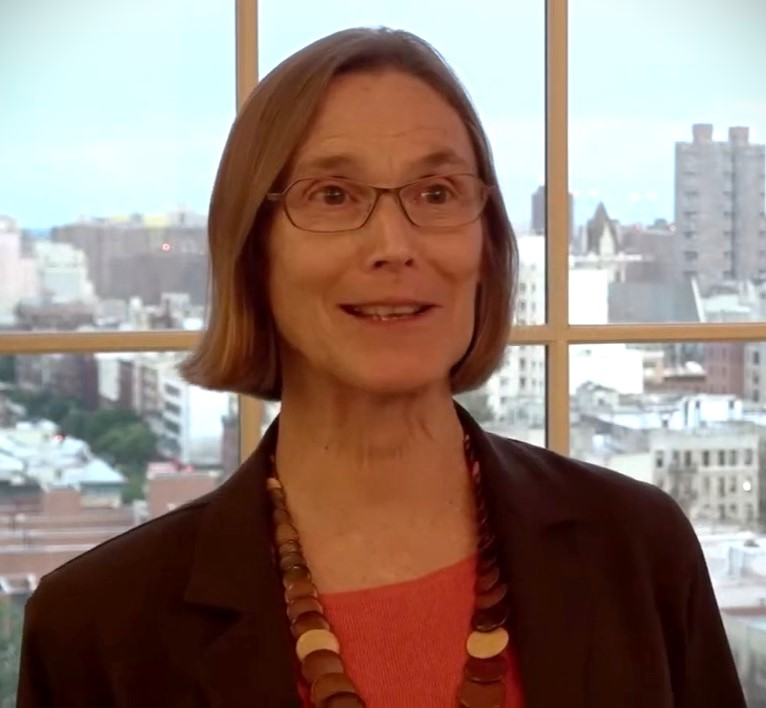
- Palm in 2014
- Born: January 6, 1954; Marysville, California, U.S.
- Died: January 24, 2024 (aged 70)
- Education: University of California, Davis; North Carolina State University
- Scientific career
- Workplaces: University of Florida; Columbia University
- Thesis: Mulch quality and nitrogen dynamics in an alley cropping system in the Peruvian Amazon (1988)

Cheryl Palm (January 6, 1954 – January 24, 2024) was an American agricultural scientist who was Professor of Agricultural and Biological Engineering at the University of Florida. Her research considers tropical land use and ecosystem function, including carbon and nutrient dynamics. She was the former Chair of the International Nitrogen Initiative and a Fellow of the American Association for the Advancement of Science and American Society of Agronomists.

== Early life and education ==
Palm studied zoology at the University of California, Davis. She spent her master's year investigating territories and mating in Vanessa annabella. She moved to North Carolina State University for doctoral research, where she studied nitrogen dynamics in cropping systems in the Peruvian Amazon. From 1991 to 2001, Palm served as principal research scientist of the Kenyan Tropical Soil Biology and Fertility Program.

== Research and career ==
Palm was Director of Research at the AgCenter and the Millennium Villages Project at Columbia University, where she investigated land use, degradation and ecosystem processes in tropical climates. She quantified carbon stocks, losses and greenhouse gas emissions following slash-and-burn in humid tropics (e.g. Indonesia, the Congo Basin and the Brazilian Amazon). She explored the nutrient dynamics of soil in Africa, looking to identify new options for soil and land rehabilitation. After receiving the World Food Prize in 2002, Palm established the Sanchez Tropical Agriculture Foundation, which provided financial aid to scientists and farmers looking to end hunger in low and middle income countries.

In 2016, Palm joined the faculty of the University of Florida. She has studied the tradeoffs and synergies between agricultural intensification strategies. She delivered the British Society of Soil Science 2018 Russell Lecture.

Palm was elected Fellow of the American Association for the Advancement of Science in 2022.

== Personal life and death ==
In 1990, Palm married Cuban soil scientist Pedro Sanchez. Palm died of Creutzfeldt-Jakob disease on January 24, 2024, having been diagnosed with the disease less than four months prior. She was 70.

== Selected publications ==
- Quirine M Ketterings; Richard Coe; Meine van Noordwijk; Yakub Ambagau’; Cheryl A Palm (June 2001). "Reducing uncertainty in the use of allometric biomass equations for predicting above-ground tree biomass in mixed secondary forests". Forest Ecology and Management. 146 (1–3): 199–209. doi:10.1016/s0378-1127(00)00460-6. ISSN 0378-1127. Wikidata Q58242302.
- Stephen A. Wood; Daniel S. Karp; Fabrice DeClerck; Claire Kremen; Shahid Naeem; Cheryl A Palm (July 16, 2015). "Functional traits in agriculture: agrobiodiversity and ecosystem services" (PDF). Trends in Ecology & Evolution. 30 (9): 531–539. doi:10.1016/j.tree.2015.06.013. ISSN 0169-5347. PMID 26190137. Wikidata Q35696934.
- P M Vitousek; R Naylor; T Crews; et al. (June 1, 2009). "Agriculture. Nutrient imbalances in agricultural development". Science. 324 (5934): 1519–1520. Bibcode:2009Sci...324.1519V. doi:10.1126/science.1170261. ISSN 0036-8075. PMID 19541981. Wikidata Q46460438.
