= Carlson Wade =

American alternative health writer

- Born: 7 June 1928; New York City
- Died: 1993 (aged 64–65)
- Occupation: Alternative health writer

Carlson Wade (7 June 1928 – 1993) was an American alternative health writer who authored many books promoting detoxification, fasting, juicing, megavitamin therapy, natural foods and raw food dieting. He developed a fad diet known as the Enzyme-Catalyst Diet.

== Biography ==
Wade was born on 7 June 1928 in New York City. He was the son of Arthur Wade and Lena Franks. He worked as a literary agent in New York from 1949 and was a member of the American Medical Writers Association.

Wade first became known for his books on sexual topics such as fetishism, homosexuality, sadomasochism and transvestism. His The Trouble Sex, published in 1961 offered behavioral clues how the American public could "detect" a lesbian. His work was classified as "pulp sexology", for example his book Sexual Deviations of the American Female (1965) gave anthropological generalisations about lesbian subcultures.

Wade's books on dieting and health were criticized by medical experts as quackery. His The New Enzyme-Catalyst Diet (1976), recommended with each meal to add raw fruit and vegetables such as bananas, celery, nuts and wheat germ.

The diet forbid the consumption of fried, processed or sugar foods. Wade argued that raw fruits and vegetables "are prime sources of enzymes which then are used by your billions of body cells to alert the mitochondria to perform internal combustion; this action helps to melt the accumulated fat in your cells, and wash them right out of your body." This idea is not supported by scientific evidence.

Dieticians noted that the statement is false because enzymes in foods are digested to amino acids and once absorbed play no enzymatic role.

Nutritionist Judith S. Stern commented that Wade's The New Enzyme-Catalyst Diet is filled with scientific misstatements such as "the most vital digestive enzyme is hydrochloric acid" and concluded that it is a "classroom example of a fad diet."

Wade's book Health Food Recipes for Gourmet Cooking, was criticized by Choice Reviews as "unintelligible jargon at best".

== Selected publications ==
- Post War Sex Problems and How to Solve Them (1946)
- The Jamestown Mistress (1960)
- Erotic Symbolism (1960, with Edward Podolsky)
- Sexual Masochism (1960, with Edward Podolsky)
- Transvestism Today (1960, with Edward Podolsky)
- Sexual Sadism (1961, with Edward Podolsky)
- The Key to Nutrition (1961)
- The Troubled Sex (1961)
- Fetichism - Sexual Nature of Erotic Symbolism (1962, with Edward Podolsky)
- Sadism (1963, with Edward Podolsky)
- The Twilight Sex (1964)
- Sexual Deviations of the American Female (1965)
- The Sexual Variants (1965)
- Male Homosexuality: A Case Study (1965)
- Sexual Deviations of the American Female (1965)
- Helping Your Health with Enzymes (1966)
- Queer Path (1967)
- Encyclopedia Erotica Sexualia (1967, with Edward Podolsky)
- Instant Health the Nature Way (1968)
- The Natural Way to Health Through Controlled Fasting (1968)
- Health Food Recipes for Gourmet Cooking (1969)
- Natural and Folk Remedies (1970)
- Health Secrets from the Orient (1973)
- Natural Hormones: The Secret of Youthful Health (1973)
- All Natural Pain Relievers (1975)
- Miracle Protein: Secret of Natural Cell-Tissue Rejuvenation (1976)
- The Miracle of Organic Vitamins for Better Health (1976)
- The New Enzyme-Catalyst Diet (1976)
- Bee Pollen and Your Health (1978)
- Lecithin Book (1980)
- Encyclopedia of Power Foods for Health and Longer Life (1980)
- Catalytic Hormones: Key to Extraordinary Weight Loss (1982)
- Inner Cleansing (1983)
- Yes! There's Life After Death (1984)
- Carlson Wade's Amino Acids Book (1985)
- Nutritional Healers: How to Eat Your Way to Better Health (1987)
- Immune Power Boosters (1989)
- Bible Healing Foods (1990)
- Eat Away Illness (1992)
- The Pocket Handbook of Juice Power (1992)
- Health from The Hive (1992)
