= WFAN =

WFAN may refer to:

- WFAN (AM), 660 kHz, a sports radio station in New York City.
- WFAN-FM, 101.9 MHz, a New York City station that simulcasts WFAN's sports radio format.
- Women, Food and Agriculture Network, an Iowa-based advocacy group.

WFAN also refers to three former radio stations in the Washington, D.C., area:

- WFAN, now WYCB.
- WFAN-FM, now WBIG-FM.
- WFAN-TV, now WFDC-DT.
