= Science & Environmental Health Network =

- Founded: 1994
- Type: Scientific
- Purpose: Protecting against the misuse of science in environmental and public health arenas, as well as advocacy of the Precautionary Principle.
- Location: Virtual organization
- Region served: International
- Key people: Carolyn Raffensperger, Ted Schettler, Nancy Myers, Katie Silberman, Sherri Seidmon, Joseph H. Guth

The Science & Environmental Health Network (SEHN) is a non-profit organization founded in 1994. Its principal aim is to use law and best practices to combat cumulative impacts, especially in matters relating to public health and the environment. It is also a keen advocate of the Precautionary Principle, releasing a number of guidelines regarding how this principle should be actioned by governments and organizations.

== SEHN's Mission and Values ==
SEHN concentrates its efforts in the application of science to help with public health and environmental issues, with a particular focus on ensuring that scientific practices are safe and will not cause harm to the environment or people in general. Their mission is to:

- Encourage science to be used in the public interest and in the interest of the environment, as well as encourage the accurate interpretation of scientific information.
- Identify information, logic and concepts that could provide significant change in the world.
- Assist governments, communities and organizations with the implementation of policies from a scientific viewpoint.

== History ==
SEHN was formed in 1994 by a number of different environmental organizations from North America, including:

- Environmental Research Foundation
- Environmental Defense Fund
- OMB Watch

All of the organizations involved in the formation of SEHN were concerned with the way science was being used in the realms of public health and the environment, noticing that the application of new scientific principles was often more harmful than beneficial. In 1999, SEHN was granted the status of a 501(c) organization.

== Notable Projects ==
=== Cumulative Impacts ===
The Cumulative Impacts project was launched by SEHN in collaboration with the Collaborative on Health and the Environment. It is designed to reduce the effect of cumulative impact on:

- Ecosystems
- Communities
- Human Health

Cumulative Impact refers to the myriad of different factors that can adversely affect one of the above three categories, such as exposure to toxic substances, nutrition and infectious diseases, among many others. The group works towards establishing best practices within science and on legal shifts, in the hope that these can be used to reduce the cumulative impact seen in many aspects of the world.

=== Precautionary Principle ===
SEHN is an active advocate of the Precautionary Principle, which advises that, when an action could have a negative effect on the public or environment, those taking the action should be expected to prove that the action is not harmful. SEHN played an active role in the promotion of this principle and Carolyn Raffensperger, executive director of SEHN, convened the Wingspread Conference on the Precautionary Principle in 1998, where the principle was defined.

Members of SEHN have also published a number of different essays on the Precautionary Principle, as well as released many statements responding to developments surrounding the principle.

=== Women's Congress for Future Generations ===
In 2012, along with Peaceful Uprising, SEHN sponsored the Women's Congress for Future Generations, a three-day gathering attended by over 100 people. The meeting was designed to highlight the role women have to play in the future of the world, especially environmental issues.
