= Pedro A. Sanchez =

American soil scientist

- Born: October 7, 1940; Havana, Cuba
- Died: January 12, 2026 (aged 85); Falmouth, Massachusetts, U.S.
- Education: Cornell University
- Awards: 2002 World Food Prize; 2003 MacArthur Fellow.
- Scientific career
- Workplaces: World Agroforestry Centre, Columbia University, North Carolina State University

Pedro Antonio Sanchez San Martín (October 7, 1940 – January 12, 2026) was the director of the Agriculture & Food Security Center, senior research scholar, and director of the Millennium Villages Project at the Earth Institute at Columbia University. Sanchez was director general of the World Agroforestry Centre (ICRAF) headquartered in Nairobi, Kenya, from 1991-2001, and served as co-chair of the UN Millennium Project Hunger Task Force. He was also professor emeritus of soil science and forestry at North Carolina State University and was a visiting professor at the University of California, Berkeley.

== Life ==
Sanchez was born in Havana, Cuba, on October 7, 1940. His parents were Antonio and Andrea Sanchez, and was married to Cecilia Montoya, later named Cecilia Sanchez. He received a bachelor's degree as well as master's and PhD degrees in soil science from Cornell University, and joined the faculty of North Carolina State University in 1968. Sanchez lived in the Philippines (working at the International Rice Research Institute), Peru (working at the Peruvian National Research Institute), Colombia (working at the International Center for Tropical Agriculture) and Kenya. He was the author of Properties and Management of Soils in the Tropics (LCCN 76-22761), co-author of Halving Hunger: It Can De Done (LCCN 2006-272246), and author of over 250 scientific publications.

He served on the Board of Agriculture and Natural Resources of the National Academy of Sciences and the Board of Directors of Millennium Promise. In January 2017, President Barack Obama appointed Sanchez to the Presidential Committee for the National Medal of Science. President Joseph Biden also named Sanchez to the President’s Committee on the National Medal of Science in 2022.

In 2011, Sanchez and his wife, Cheryl Palm, set up the Sanchez-Palm Girls Scholarship Fund for secondary-school-aged girls in poor, rural parts of Africa. The fund was intended to support the girls' ability to attend secondary schools (high schools) and also improve those schools with computers and internet availability. Said Sanchez, "Cheryl and I are proud to play a part in advancing girls education, because we know an educated girl can have a profound impact on the development of a community."

He was a Research Professor of Tropical Soils at the University of Florida Soil & Water Sciences Department and core faculty of the Institute for Sustainable Food Systems.

Sanchez was a board member of WomenStrong International, an organization that supports "women-driven solutions to extreme urban poverty".

== Early life ==
Sanchez was from Cuba, where his father was a farmer and businessman. "In a way, agriculture is in my blood," Sanchez said. "My father's love for the soil played a large role in my decision to devote my efforts to solving the world's food problems," said Sanchez.

== Education ==
Sanchez received his BS, MS and PhD (1968) degrees in soil science from Cornell University. As a college sophomore at Cornell University, Sanchez was suddenly unable to pay his tuition and housing, so he became a dishwasher in his fraternity to pay the bills. He eventually became president of the fraternity, and had to change clothes after presiding at meetings to wash dishes. He became a naturalized U.S. citizen in 1968.

== ICRAF ==
Sanchez began his work in Africa when he was 50 years old. He has helped millions of farmers boost their crop yields by planting trees that add nitrogen to the soil. "I love to play with dirt," Sanchez said. Asked if he gardens, he replies: "My garden is a village in western Kenya called Sauri, where they made me an honorary tribal chief, telling me that the trees had restored the villagers' dignity because now they could feed their families."

== Honors ==
=== World Food Prize ===
Sanchez was the 2002 World Food Prize laureate. According to the World Food Prize Foundation, "By pioneering ways to restore fertility to the poorest and most degraded soils in Latin America and Africa, The 2002 World Food Prize Laureate, Dr. Pedro A. Sanchez, has made a major contribution to preserving our delicate ecosystem, while at the same time offering great hope to all those struggling to survive on marginal lands around the world."

United Nations Secretary-General Kofi Annan wrote the following on the awarding of the 2002 World Food Prize to Sanchez: "Through his research in the Cerrado of Brazil, Dr. Sanchez developed ways to revitalize tropical soils which had been considered extremely unproductive, thus greatly expanding Brazil’s agricultural output. Subsequently, in East Africa, where Dr. Sanchez served as Director-General of the International Centre for Research in Agroforestry, his innovative approach to restoring nutrients to severely depleted soils resulted in dramatic increases in crop yields, affecting hundreds of thousands of small farmers. It is clear that Dr. Pedro Sanchez’s achievements offer great promise that the Green Revolution can be spread through Sub-Saharan Africa. It is particularly fitting that the World Food Prize will be presented to Dr. Sanchez on 24 October, United Nations Day. Nothing could better reflect the direct connection between Dr. Sanchez’s accomplishments and his new mission on behalf of the Millennium Project of the United Nations."

=== MacArthur Fellow ===
Sanchez was a 2003 MacArthur Fellow. Sanchez was one of the 24 individuals to receive the honor in 2003.

=== Great Immigrants ===
In 2021, Sanchez was named by Carnegie Corporation of New York as an honoree of the Great Immigrants Award. Sanchez said, "When a farmer comes to me and says, 'Because of what you have taught us, my family is no longer hungry and I have my dignity restored' — wow. That's more important than all the honors I've gotten."

=== Other accolades and recognition ===
Sanchez received honorary Doctor of Science degrees from the Catholic University of Leuven (Belgium), Guelph University (Canada), Ohio State University and North Carolina State University. He was a Fellow of the American Society of Agronomy, the Soil Science Society of America, the American Association for the Advancement of Science, and has received the International Soil Science Award, the International Service in Agronomy Award, the Crop Science Society of America Presidential Award in 2003, and the Soil Science Society of America Presidential Award in 2012. He was an honorary member of the Colombian and Cuban Societies of Soil Science. Sanchez was anointed Chief by the Luo in western Kenya with the name of Odera Akang'o, and by the Ikaram of southern Nigeria with the name of Atunluse. He was elected to the US National Academy of Sciences in 2012. Sanchez received decorations from the governments of Colombia and Peru. He received the Charles A. Black Award from the Council for Agricultural Science and Technology, presented to a food or agricultural scientist actively engaged in research who has made significant scientific contributions to science, and was elected as a member of the American Academy of Arts & Sciences in 2008.

== Death ==
Sanchez died on January 12, 2026, at his home in Falmouth, Massachusetts. Mashal Husain, President of the World Food Prize Foundation, wrote: "Pedro Sanchez was a scientist of rare vision and deep humanity. He understood that research matters most when it reaches farmers' fields, restores dignity and creates lasting opportunities for communities that have been overlooked for far too long."

Honorary titles
Preceded by Per Pinstrup-Andersen	World Food Prize; 2002	Succeeded by Catherine Bertini
