= Melissa Perry =

Melissa Perry may refer to:

- Melissa Perry (judge), Australian judge
- Melissa Perry (epidemiologist), American researcher
- Melissa Harris-Perry, American writer
  - Melissa Harris-Perry (TV program), her TV show
