= Carolyn Raffensperger =

American lawyer

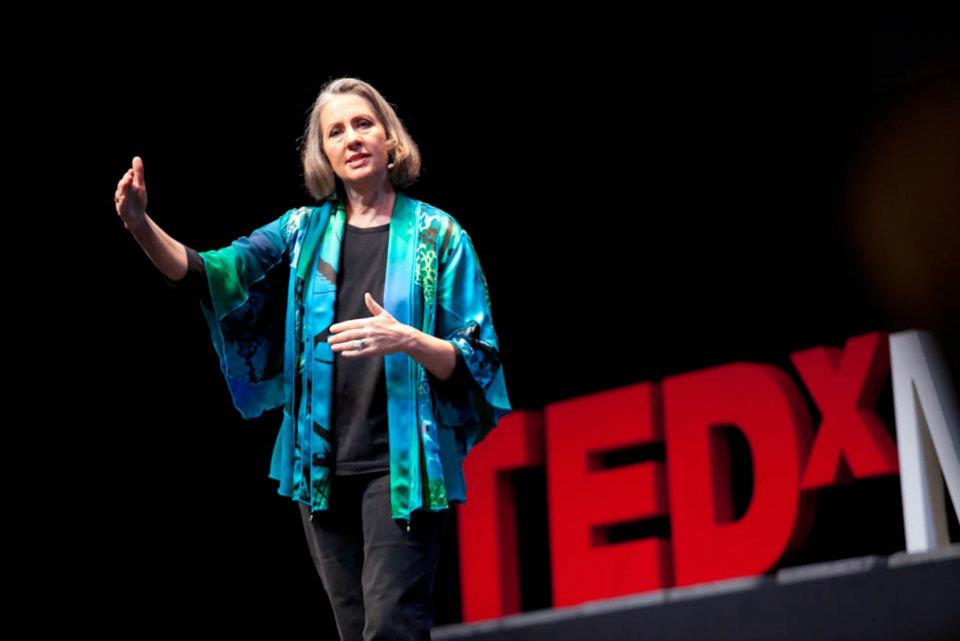
- Education: Wheaton College; Northwestern University
- Occupations: author, lawyer, environmentalist
- Spouse: Fred Kirschenmann (died 2025)
- Writing career
- Language: English

Carolyn E. Raffensperger is an environmental lawyer and the executive director of the Science & Environmental Health Network, as well as being a leading expert on the Precautionary Principle. She has authored a number of papers and publications, as well as being featured in a number of notable magazines. Raffensperger was also a state field representative for the Sierra Club.

== Early life ==
Raffensperger was raised in Chicago and is the daughter of John G. Raffensperger, a paediatric surgeon. After gaining an interest in archaeology while at college, she went on to study a bachelor's degree at Wheaton College, before then completing her master's degree at Northwestern University. She then worked in Dolores, Colorado, studying artifacts from the Anasazi people. She went on to work for the Sierra Club. She was married to American agriculturist Fred Kirschenmann.

== Career ==
Raffensperger joined the Science & Environmental Health Network (SEHN) in 1994 and became its executive director. Raffensperger has written on the Precautionary Principle. She has spoken in public on the issue and has appeared on TEDx and EnviroVideo with Karl Grossman. In 1998, Raffensperger convened and attended the Wingspread Conference on the Precautionary Principle. The first use of the phrase "ecological medicine" is attributed to Raffensperger, in an article entitled "Our Planet, Our Selves" on the UTNE website. Ecological medicine refers to the way in which people and the environment interact, and how an individual's acts towards the environment can have a negative effect on health.

== Publications ==
- Raffensperger, Jackson, Tickner (1999). Protecting Public Health and the Environment: Implementing The Precautionary Principle, Island Press, 391 pages. ISBN 978-1559636889
- Raffensperger, Tickner, Myers (1999). The Precautionary Principle in Action: A Handbook.
- Raffensperger, Myers (2005). Precautionary Tools for Reshaping Environmental Policy. MIT Press, 400 pages. ISBN 978-0262633239
