= Catherine Bertini =

American public servant

Cathy Bertini
- Bertini in 1997

Executive Director of the World Food Programme
- In office April 1992 – April 2002
- Secretary General: Boutros Boutros-Ghali; Kofi Annan
- Preceded by: James Ingram
- Succeeded by: James Morris

Personal details
- Born: March 30, 1950 (age 76) Syracuse, New York, U.S.
- Party: Republican
- Education: State University of New York, Albany (BA)

Catherine Bertini is an American public servant. She is the 2003 World Food Prize Laureate. She was the Executive Director of the United Nations World Food Program from 1992 to 2002. She served as the UN Under-Secretary for Management from 2003 to 2005. Currently she is a distinguished fellow at the Chicago Council on Global Affairs, the chair of the Board of the Global Alliance for Improved Nutrition (GAIN) and the chair of the executive board of the Crop Trust.

== Background and education ==
Bertini was born in Syracuse, New York in 1950. She earned a bachelor's degree in political science from the State University of New York at Albany. At Albany, Bertini was president of the College Republicans and worked full-time in the last gubernatorial campaign of Nelson A. Rockefeller. For five years after college, she held positions in the Republican Party as a youth director in New York State and for the Republican National Committee, and as a congressional campaign manager for George Wortley (R- Syracuse). In 1982, she ran for US Congress herself in the 9th District of Illinois.

== International career ==
=== Executive Director of the World Food Program, United Nations ===
Bertini was appointed in 1992 by the Secretary-General of the United Nations and the Director-General of the Food and Agriculture Organization, on the recommendation of President George H. W. Bush. In 1997, she was reappointed with the endorsement of President Bill Clinton, together with that of the Group of 77 developing countries and the executive board of WFP.

As chief executive officer of the organization, Bertini transformed WFP into the world's largest and most responsive humanitarian organization. She is credited with assisting hundreds of millions of victims of wars and natural disasters throughout Africa, Asia, Latin America, the Middle East, and parts of Eastern Europe and the former Soviet Union. In particular, she was widely praised for her efforts to end famine in North Korea; averting starvation in Afghanistan by delivering enormous amounts of urgently needed food aid in 2001; ensuring the provision of food supplies during the crises in Bosnia and Kosovo; and in 2000, averting the mass starvation that threatened 16 million people in the Horn of Africa.

Bertini also led efforts to empower poor women through the use of food aid. In recognition of her leadership at WFP in ending famine and decreasing hunger, she received the World Food Prize, known as the "Nobel Prize for Food and Agriculture" in 2003. Rather than accepting the prize money, she established the Catherine Bertini Trust Fund for Girls' Education that provides grants to local organizations that improve access to training and education for women and girls.

She also chaired the UN System Standing Committee on Nutrition and served as the Secretary General's envoy twice: for drought in the Horn of Africa and for humanitarian needs in Gaza and the West Bank.

=== Under-Secretary General For Management, United Nations ===
Secretary-General Kofi Annan appointed Bertini as Under-Secretary for Management in 2003. She was responsible for administering the United Nations' human, financial and physical resources.

=== Bill & Melinda Gates Foundation ===
From 2007 to 2009, she served as a Senior Fellow in Agricultural Development at the Bill & Melinda Gates Foundation. She contributed to the development of the foundation's new agricultural framework, seeking to improve the lives of poor farmers, especially women farmers. She led the first gender initiatives at the Bill and Melinda Gates Foundation.

=== The Chicago Council on Global Affairs ===
Catherine Bertini is a Distinguished Fellow at the Chicago Council on Global Affairs. She helped create and co-chaired the council's Global Agriculture Development Initiative (GADI) from 2008 to 2013. GADI has been an influential voice in US government circles advocating for new priorities for support for poor farmers within international development programs. She also chaired the council's two Girls in Rural Economies projects, one in 2011 and one in 2018 and co-chaired the council's domestic Agriculture Task Force in 2007 and 2012.

=== The Rockefeller Foundation ===
From 2017 to 2019 Catherine served as a Rockefeller Foundation Fellow. Bertini worked on a fellowship project titled "Leadership in Response to a Changing World" which reviewed the international institutions and programs that could help advance humanitarian relief, development, and pandemic response. She published a report titled "Leading Change in United Nations Organizations", which gives guidance to incoming senior management in the United Nations and advice on leading transformational change.

== Domestic career ==
During the President George H.W. Bush administration, Catherine Bertini served as Acting Assistant Secretary of the Family Support Administration in the United States Department of Health and Human Services, and as Assistant Secretary of Agriculture for Food and Consumer Services at the United States Department of Agriculture.

During the Reagan administration, Bertini was the Director of the Office of Family Assistance at DHHS. She was responsible for regulations that strengthened education and training support for the poorest American women in support of the Family Support Act of 1988.

=== Board for International Food and Agricultural Development ===
President George W. Bush appointed and President Barack Obama reappointed her to the Board for International Food and Agricultural Development (BIFAD), where she advised USAID for nine years (2006–2015) on agriculture and higher education issues pertinent to food insecurity in developing countries.

=== Accountability Review Board ===
In 2012, Catherine Bertini was named to serve on the State Department's five-member Accountability Review Board that examined the facts and circumstances of the attacks on the U.S. consulate in Benghazi, Libya.

=== State and Local Government ===
Earlier in her career, Bertini was appointed by Illinois Governor James R. Thompson as a member of the Illinois Human Rights Commission, and as a member of the Illinois State Scholarship Commission.

== Academic career ==
=== Maxwell School of Citizenship and Public Affairs ===
In 2005, Bertini joined the faculty of the Maxwell School of Citizenship and Public Affairs at Syracuse University. She taught graduate courses in Managing Change in the United Nations, Girl's Education, International Organizations, Executive Leadership, Food Security, and Post-Conflict Reconstruction. She served for one year as Chair of the International Relations Department and one year as the vice-chair of the Public Administration and International Affairs Department. She taught at the Maxwell School of Citizenship and Public Affairs for twelve years and in 2018 was named professor emeritus.

=== Gerald R. Ford School of Public Policy ===
In 2002, she taught for one semester as Policy Maker in Residence at the Gerald R. Ford School of Public Policy at the University of Michigan.

=== Institute of Politics at the John F. Kennedy School of Government ===
In 1986, she taught for one semester as a Fellow at the Institute of Politics at the John F. Kennedy School of Government at Harvard University.

== Private sector career ==
Before joining the federal government, she served for ten years in public affairs positions at the Container Corporation of America in Chicago, where she ran its public affairs department, its foundation, and where she created its political action committee.

== Personal ==
In the 2024 United States presidential election, Bertini endorsed Kamala Harris.

== Recent awards ==
Bertini is the 2003 World Food Prize Laureate and, in 2007, was awarded the Gene White Lifetime Achievement Award for Child Nutrition. She has also been named a Champion of the 2021 United Nations Food Systems Summit. Concern Worldwide U.S. presented her its Brigid Award in 2010. She is also the recipient of the 2011 Borlaug CAST Communication Award. In 2013, she received the Women Extraordinaire Award from the International Women Associates. Twelve universities in four countries have awarded her honorary degrees.

== Professional affiliations ==
- Global Food Banking Network, member
- Global Alliance for Improved Nutrition, chair of board
- Lugar Center, Affiliated Expert
- Center for Strategic & International Studies, senior non-resident advisor
- Stuart Family Foundation, board member
- Scowcroft Institute, Bush School, Texas A&M University, member of advisory board
- COMPACT 2025 Leadership Council of the International Food Policy Research Institute, member
- Council on Foreign Relations, member
- National Academy of Public Administration, Fellow
- Global Child Nutrition Foundation, honorary advisor
- International Union of Food Science and Technology, Fellow

== Honorary degrees ==
- Doctor of Science, McGill University, Montreal, Canada
- Doctor of Humane Letters, State University of New York, Cortland, New York
- Doctorate, Slovak Agricultural University, Nitra, Slovak Republic
- Doctor of Science, Pine Manor College, Boston, Massachusetts
- Doctor of Humane Letters, American University of Rome, Italy
- Doctor of Public Service, John Cabot University, Rome Italy
- Doctor of Humane Letters, Loyola University Chicago, Illinois
- Doctor of Humane Letters, Dakota Wesleyan University, Mitchell, South Dakota
- Doctor of Humane Letters, University of South Carolina, Spartanburg, SC
- Doctor of Humane Letters, Colgate University, Hamilton, New York
- Doctor of Humane Letters, University of Delaware, Newark, Delaware
- Doctor of Humane Letters, Bryant University, Rhode Island

== Selected past board service ==
- Board of International Food and Agricultural Development, USAID Presidential Appointee, Washington D.C.
- UN Women Audit Advisory Committee, member
- Hilton Foundation Humanitarian Prize, juror
- United Nations System Standing Committee on Nutrition, chair
- United Nations, chief executives' Board member and chair, management committee, NY
- United Nations International School Board of Trustees, chair, NY
- World Food Security's High-Level Panel of Experts on Food Security and Nutrition, member, Rome, Italy
- Tupperware Brands, member
- Henri Dunant Center for Humanitarian Dialogue, board member, Geneva, Switzerland
- Commodity Credit Corporation, presidential appointee, Washington D.C.
- Steppenwolf Theatre Company, board member, Chicago, IL
- Consultative Group on International Agricultural Research (CGIAR), system management board member

Diplomatic posts
Preceded by James Ingram	Executive Director of the World Food Programme; 1992–2002	Succeeded by James Morris
Honorary titles
Preceded by Pedro A. Sanchez	Recipient of the World Food Prize; 2003	Succeeded by Monty Jones; Yuan Longping
