= Chuck Benbrook =

American agricultural economist

Charles M. Benbrook
- Born: November 26, 1949 (age 76); Los Angeles
- Education: Harvard University; University of Wisconsin-Madison
- Spouse: Karen Lutz Benbrook
- Children: 5
- Scientific career
- Fields: Agricultural economics
- Workplaces: Washington State University
- Thesis: Farm structural characteristics, management practices, and the environment : an exploratory analysis (1980)

Charles M. "Chuck" Benbrook is an American agricultural economist, pesticide litigation consultant and former adjunct professor with the Center for Sustaining Agriculture and Natural Resources at Washington State University. Benbrook was also the scientific advisor for the Organic industry research organization "The Organic Center" from 2004 to June 2012.

== Education ==
Benbrook holds a bachelor's degree in economics from Harvard University (1971), as well as an M.A. (1979) and a PhD (1980) in agricultural economics from the University of Wisconsin-Madison.

== Career ==
Benbrook spent 18 years (1979–1997) working in Washington, DC, on agricultural policy and regulation. During this time, he served for two years (1981–1983) as the director of the Subcommittee on Department Operations, Research, and Foreign Agriculture of the U.S. House of Representatives. He also directed the National Academy of Sciences' Board on Agriculture from 1984 to 1990. On a 1993 Frontline program entitled "In Our Children's Food," which focused on a NAS report on pesticides of which Benbrook was the lead author, he warned that the regulatory limits on pesticides were based on adults, even though they are more dangerous to children. He also suggested that he had been fired from the NAS panel for criticizing the pesticide industry. However, NAS president Frank Press reported Benbrook's termination was related to repeated warnings over his public comments on incomplete research that did not reflect the views of the academic professional reviewers at the academy.

Benbrook then served as chief scientist at the Organic Center, an organic industry funded research organization operating under the management of the Organic Trade Association, from 2004 until 2012.

Between 2012 and 2015, Benbrook was an adjunct research professor at Washington State University on contract with the Center for Sustaining Agriculture and Natural Resources(SCANR). At the CSANR, he directed the organic industry-funded "Measure to Manage" program. Here he conducted several studies funded entirely by the organic food industry, who also paid for his trips to Washington where he lobbied for requiring a label on genetically modified organisms. Benbrook's contract with Washington State was terminated after reports he failed to disclose these industry funded conflicts of interest. As of September 2015, Benbrook was no longer on the faculty of Washington State University.

Benbrook has served as an expert witness in more than a dozen lawsuits involving GMOs and pesticides, and since 2014 he has been a paid litigation consulted for mass tort pesticide litigators on class action cases involving glyphosate, paraquat, and chlorpyrifos. Court reporting revealed Benbrook and his daughter were paid more than $500,000 in related consulting associated with pesticide lawsuits.

In 2018 Benbrook launched the Heartland Research Study and Heartland Health Research Alliance, LTD with reported seed money from Organic Valley, and other financial assistance from glyphosate litigator Robert F. Kennedy, Jr., and organic grocery magnate Mark Squire. The study group, co-chaired by epidemiologists Melissa Perry and Philip J. Landrigan, claims to be researching correlations between Midwest pesticide use and health issues for women and children to promote a shift to organic production methods. In June 2023 HHRA noted Benbrook was now the "former" executive director.

== Research ==
One of Benbrook's best-known studies is one published in 2012, funded by the organic industry, which concluded that genetically modified foods have resulted in increased pesticide use, purportedly because weeds are developing resistance to glyphosate. However, some critics stated this study was flawed, because Benbrook did not take into account the fact that glyphosate is less toxic than other herbicides, thus the net toxicity may decrease even as the total herbicide use increases. In addition, Graham Brookes, co-director of PG Economics, a company providing services to agri-technology companies, accused Benbrook of making subjective estimates of herbicide use because the data provided by the National Agricultural Statistics Service doesn't distinguish between genetically modified and non-genetically modified crops. Brookes had published a study whose conclusions contradicted those of Benbrook's earlier in 2012. Brookes also stated that Benbrook had made "biased and inaccurate" assumptions.

More recently, in December 2013, Benbrook was the lead author of a study which reported that organic milk contained significantly higher levels of heart-healthy omega-3 fatty acids. The study was funded in part by the organic milk producer Organic Valley, although Allison Aubrey of NPR reported that they had no role in the study's design or analysis.

In July 2014, Benbrook was a co-author on a literature review of 343 studies examining the nutritional differences between organic and non-organic food. It concluded that organic food had higher levels of antioxidants and lower levels of cadmium, but also lower levels of protein than did conventional food.

== Views ==
=== Genetically modified food ===
Benbrook was a signatory on a 2013 statement issued by the minor anti-GMO group the European Network of Scientists for Social and Environmental Responsibility which asserted that there is no consensus on the safety of genetically modified food. He has said this statement was motivated in part by I-522, a bill introduced in Washington state that year. When contacted by Seattle Weekly, Benbrook also said that he thinks that "...technology that alters the composition of food could lead to problems beyond science's ability to predict."

He gave an address to a National Research Council study group on genetically modified foods in September 2014. In his address, he argued that the reason many people are not confident in the safety of genetically modified foods is that the regulatory systems in place rely too much on studies supplied by companies that develop such foods.

In response, a 2017 Huffington Post review of Benbrook's GMO claims reported, "[Benbrook] has been bankrolled by the organic industry for years and his research is always favorable to the anti-GMO organic industry." Adding, "Quite simply, the money trail behind Benbrook's latest work can be directly traced to the organic industry that greatly profits from any bad news about Monsanto, glyphosate or GMOs."

=== Pesticides ===
Benbrook criticized a Stanford Center for Health Policy 2012 paper which concluded that organic food did not confer significant health advantages relative to conventional food. In a letter to the Annals of Internal Medicine, he wrote that their finding of a 30 percent "risk difference" between organic and conventional food was misleading, because the metric does not refer to health risk, and that pesticide risk is a function of many other factors in addition to contamination. In 2015, Benbrook and Philip Landrigan co-authored a perspective piece in the New England Journal of Medicine urging the United States government to conduct new assessments of the safety of glyphosate, which had been declared a probable human carcinogen earlier that year. A review by Discover Magazine of Benbrook's claims reported that University of California, Davis plant pathologist Dr. Pamela Ronald found "Benbrook's conclusions conflict with virtually all peer reviewed studies, including two recent studies in PNAS and Nature."
