= Borlaug CAST Communication Award =

- Awarded for: agriculture-related science communication
- Presented by: Council for Agricultural Science and Technology (CAST)
- Formerly called: Charles A. Black Award
- First award: 1986
- Website: Council for Agricultural Science and Technology

The Borlaug CAST Communication Award, formerly the Charles A. Black Award, is an annual award presented by the Council for Agricultural Science and Technology (CAST) to a "scientist, engineer, technologist, or other professional working in the agricultural, environmental, or food sectors for contributing to the advancement of science in the public policy arena".

The Council for Agricultural Science and Technology (CAST) is a non-profit whose primary purpose is to publish science-based reviews and reports on topics related to agriculture and food. As originally named, the award acknowledged the contributions of Charles Allen Black, founding president of CAST. Its current name honors Nobel Prize winner Norman Borlaug, "The Man Who Fed the World". who was the author of the first of CAST's publications, in 1973.

== Recipients ==
As the Charles A. Black Award:

- 1986: Charles Allen Black
- 1987: William E. Larson
- 1989: Stanley E. Curtis
- 1990: Donald E. Davis
- 1991: Homer McKay LeBaron
- 1992: John T. Pesek
- 1993: F. M. Clydesdale
- 1994: Frederick John Francis
- 1995: Dale E. Bauman
- 1996: Luther G. Tweeten
- 1997: Neil E. Harl
- 1998: Per Pinstrup-Andersen
- 1999: Abner W. Womack
- 2000: Dennis Keeney
- 2001: Judith S. Stern
- 2002: C. O. Qualset
- 2003: Kong Luen Heong
- 2004: Marjorie Hoy
- 2005: Norman Borlaug
- 2006: Stanley R. Johnson
- 2007: David H. Baker
- 2008: Pedro A. Sanchez
- 2009: Richard Wayne Skaggs

As the Borlaug CAST Communication Award:

- 2010: Akinwumi Adesina
- 2011: Catherine Bertini
- 2012: Carl K. Winter
- 2013: Jeffrey N. Simmons
- 2014: Alison Van Eenennaam
- 2015: C. S. Prakash
- 2016: Kevin Folta
- 2017: Jayson Lusk
- 2018: Marty Matlock
- 2019: Frank Mitloehner
- 2020: Alexa J. Lamm
- 2021: Sarah Davidson Evanega
- 2022: Martin Wiedmann
- 2023: Alison R. Bentley
- 2024 Jack A. Bobo

== See also ==
- Public awareness of science
- Science journalism
