= Charles Allen Black =

American agricultural scientist (1916–2002)

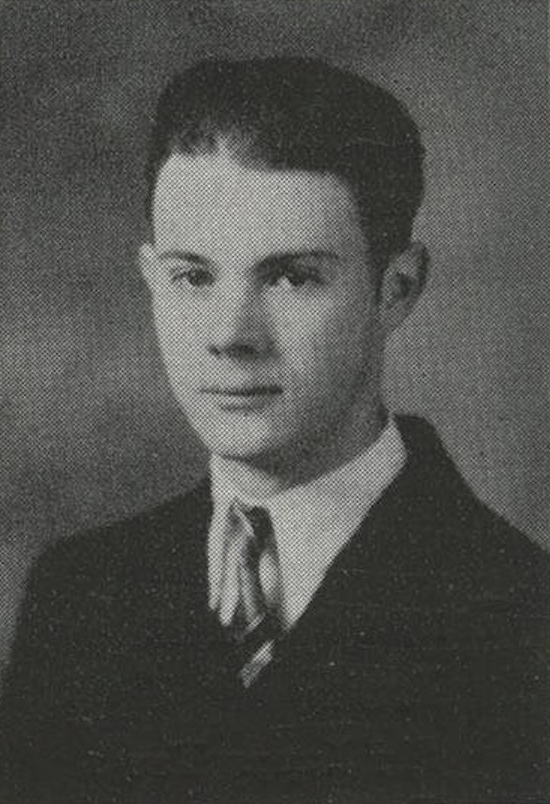
- Born: January 22, 1916; Lone Tree, Iowa, US
- Died: July 6, 2002 (aged 86)
- Awards: Borlaug CAST Communication Award (1986)

Academic background
- Education: Colorado State University; Iowa State College

Academic work
- Discipline: agricultural science
- Institutions: Iowa State College
- Main interests: soil fertility and phosphorus
- Notable works: Soil-Plant Relationships

Charles Allen Black (January 22, 1916 – July 6, 2002) was an agronomist at Iowa State College, specializing in soil fertility and phosphorus. He was named the Charles F. Curtiss Distinguished Professor in Agriculture in 1967.

Black served as president of the Soil Science Society of America (SSSA) in 1962 and the American Society of Agronomy (ASA) in 1971. He was the founding president of the Council for Agricultural Science and Technology (CAST) in 1972. Among other awards, he received an Agronomic Service Award (ASA, 1986), a Bouyoucos Soil Science Distinguished Career Award (SSSA, 1981) and a Soil Science Distinguished Award (SSSA, 1992).

== Early life and education ==
Charles Allen Black was born on January 22, 1916, in Lone Tree, Iowa. His parents were Guy Cameron Black and Katharine L. Koehr. He received a B.S. in chemistry and soil science from Colorado State University in 1937. He then attended Iowa State College, receiving a M.S. in 1938 and a Ph.D. in soil fertility in 1942.

== Career ==
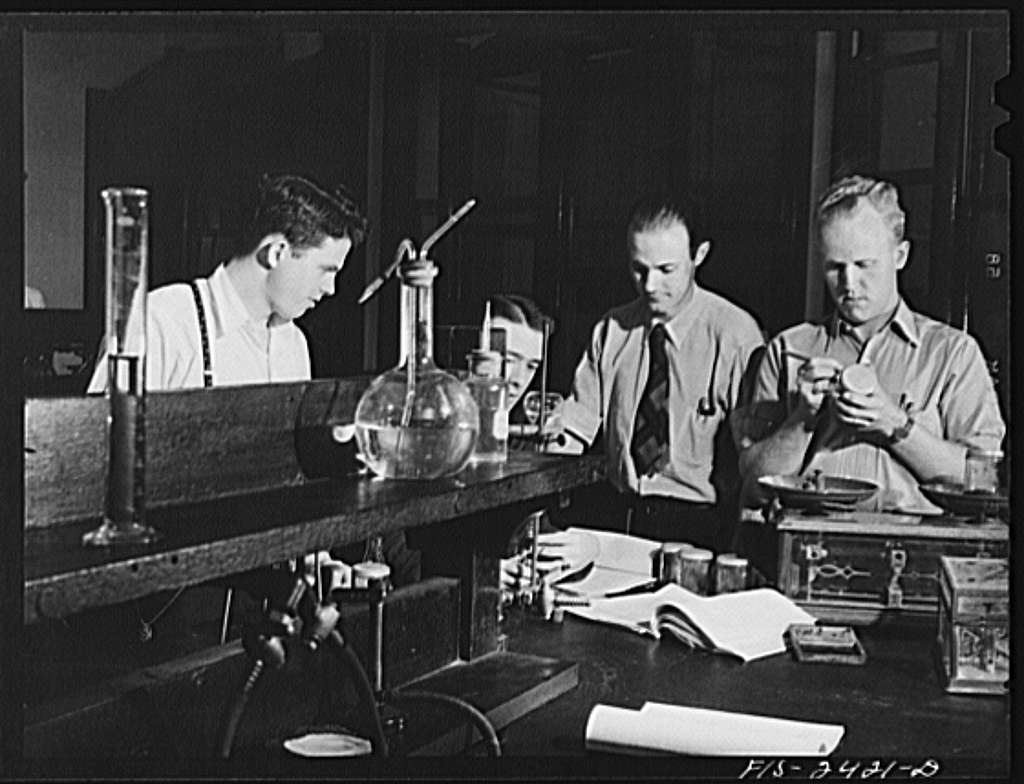
Black (second from right) in the soils laboratory at Iowa State College

Black taught agronomy at Iowa State College as an instructor (1939–1943), assistant professor (1944–1946), associate professor (1946–1949), and professor (1949–1980). In 1967, he was named the Charles F. Curtiss Distinguished Professor in Agriculture. Black officially retired in 1979, but continued teaching as an adjunct professor until 1985.

In addition, Black served in the United States Navy Reserve during World War II. He was a visiting professor from 1955 to 1956 at Cornell University, and a National Science Foundation fellow from 1964 to 1965 at the University of California, Davis.

Black studied soil science, fertility, and chemistry, with a research specialization in soil phosphorus. He directed experimental work in both the field and laboratory, taught courses, and worked with multidisciplinary task forces reporting to members of Congress on issues relating to food and agriculture.

Black published a graduate textbook on Soil-Plant Relationships (1957) and was the editor of books including Methods of Soil Analysis (1965), Agronomy in a Changing World and Research Needs for the Seventies (1971) and Soils Derived From Volcanic Ash in Japan (1977) with Yoshiaki Ishizuka.

Black served as president of the Soil Science Society of America (1962) and the American Society of Agronomy (1971). Black was also a member of the International Society of Soil Science. Concerned that political leaders and policy decision-makers lacked sound, scientific information about food and agriculture, Black founded the Council for Agricultural Science and Technology (CAST), becoming its first president in 1972. Described as its "moving spirit", Black worked "to get accurate agricultural information from food and agricultural scientists to congressional committees, governmental agencies, and the media."

“We need to re-examine continually, in the light of current circumstances, what we are doing in agriculture... If we temper our observations with realism, they can provide valuable guidance for the future.” Charles A. Black, 1977.

Charles Allen Black died on July 6, 2002, aged 86.

== Awards and honors ==
- 1957, inaugural Soil Science Award, American Society of Agronomy
- 1962, Fellow, American Society of Agronomy
- 1969, Fellow, American Institute of Chemists
- 1975, honorary member, Soil Science Society of America
- 1976, Fellow, American Association for the Advancement of Science (AAAS)
- 1976, Edward W. Browning Achievement Award for the Improvement of Food Sources
- 1979, Distinguished Service Award, Agricultural Communicators Network (previously American Agricultural Editors Association)
- 1980, Henry A. Wallace Award for Distinguished Service to Agriculture, Iowa State
- 1981, Honorary Member, American Society of Agronomy
- 1981, inaugural Bouyoucos Soil Science Distinguished Career Award, Soil Science Society of America
- 1986, Agronomic Service Award, American Society of Agronomy
- 1986, Charles A. Black Award for Exemplary Contributions to Public Understanding of Food and Agricultural Science and Technology, inaugural recipient of award named in his honor by the Council for Agricultural Science and Technology (CAST), since renamed the Borlaug CAST Communication Award.
- 1992, Soil Science Distinguished Award, Soil Science Society of America

== Other interests ==
Black played the French horn and built and operated short wave radios. He volunteered with WOI radio in Ames, Iowa. Black compiled a pronunciation guide for English-speaking radio announcers, containing 1,500 musical terms and musicians' names.

== Archives ==
- "Charles Allen Black papers". CARDinal: Cyclone Archival Research Database. Iowa State University.
