= Paul Wesley Johnson =

American writer, policymaker, and environmentalist

Paul Wesley Johnson (June 10, 1941 – February 15, 2021) was an American writer, policymaker, and environmentalist.

== Early career ==
After high school Johnson got his private and commercial pilot's certificates and airframe and power plant ratings at the University of Illinois Institute of Aviation. In the early 1960s he served in the Peace Corps' Ghana 2 contingent, teaching sheet metal and auto mechanics in Kpando, in the Volta Region. After the PC he studied forestry at Michigan, then in the mid-1960s worked for the US Forestry Service in Washington State. In the later 1960s he taught in Ghana again, this time for the Teachers for West Africa Program, at the School of Forestry in Sunyani. After returning to Michigan, he took a forest ecology course with the Organization for Tropical Studies which took him to Honduras and Costa Rica (at the OTS' La Selva Heredia), then did graduate work on Cordia alliodora at what is now the Tropical Agriculture Research and Higher Education Center in Turrialba, Costa Rica. In the early 1970s he did doctoral work in (and taught) forestry at the School of Natural Resources of the University of Michigan.

In 1974 he and his family bought and moved to a dairy farm in northeast Iowa. In the late 1970s he was elected a Winneshiek County Soil and Water Conservation District Commissioner.

== Political career ==
In the 1980s Johnson served three two-year terms in the Iowa House of Representatives, helping to author, manage, and secure passage of a number of bills supporting soil and water conservation and energy efficiency. One of these bills created the Resource Enhancement and Protection program (REAP), which is still operational over 30 years later and has financed thousands of environmental protection initiatives in Iowa; another, the Groundwater Protection Act, inter alia created and provided financing for the Leopold Center for Sustainable Agriculture at Iowa State University.

In 1993 President Clinton appointed Johnson Chief of the Soil Conservation Service (SCS), the largest (by "covered" acreage) of the US Department of Agriculture's 29 agencies, where he served under Secretaries Mike Espy and Dan Glickman. During his tenure Johnson worked to expand the mission of the agency to address a more comprehensive set of natural resource problems and opportunities. Reflecting Johnson's work, in 1995 the SCS was renamed the Natural Resources Conservation Service (NRCS). While there, he passionately advocated for public policies to elevate conservation efforts on privately owned “working” land, including cropland, pasture, and rangeland. He also championed expansion of the Wetland Reserve Program and more efficient use of the Environmental Quality Incentives Program (EQIP) and Stewardship Incentives Program to reward farmers and ranchers who sought to achieve multiple environmental benefits on their working lands—e.g. soil erosion control, water quality improvement, provision of wildlife habitat, and maximizing biological diversity ("multiple use policy"). In addition, he worked with the Secretary's office to create a National Conservation Buffer Initiative that made use of the continuous sign-up provision of the Conservation Reserve Program and other USDA conservation cost-share programs to greatly expand the use of filter strips, grassed waterways, and other conservation buffer practices. As Chief, Johnson worked aggressively throughout his tenure to emphasize the importance of using sound science to undergird agency programs and practice and took creative action to strengthen agency's scientific capabilities through creation of institutes and reshaping technical units. He also sought to bring about cultural change within the agency to accommodate greater diversity in the agency's workforce. He retired from the NRCS in 1997.

In the early 2000s he served as head of the Iowa Department of Natural Resources under Governor Tom Vilsack. Among other priorities, at the DNR he championed state support for buffer strips. In 2004 he unsuccessfully ran for the US House of Representatives.

He also served on the Board on Agriculture of the National Academy of Sciences and the Board of Directors of the Iowa Peace Institute, as well as on the boards of a number of environmental and conservation organizations, including the Aldo Leopold Foundation, Winneshiek Energy District, The Land Institute, the Iowa Natural Heritage Foundation, the Iowa Nature Conservancy, the Institute for Alternative Agriculture, the Pine Bluff 4-H Camp, and Iowa's Environmental Protection Commission.

== Later life ==
After his retirement, Johnson lived on his northeast-Iowa family dairy, sheep, and Christmas tree farm Oneota Slopes and wrote essays for the Iowa progressive news site Bleeding Heartland. His wife Pat Johnson taught social work at Luther College. He has three children and six grandchildren.

Before and during the COVID-19 pandemic, family friend Ellen MacDonald conducted a series of recorded interviews with Johnson which she later transcribed and published as "In His Own Words."

After his death, Johnson's former colleagues and family launched an effort to extend his legacy—aiming, eventually, toward the US federal government's adoption of a national private lands conservation act/policy—under the moniker of the Johnson Center for Land Stewardship Policy. In October 2025 Ice Cube Press, along with the JCLSP, published "We Can Do Better," a compendium of Johnson's writings.
