= Deborah Koons Garcia =

American filmmaker and environmental advocate

- Born: United States
- Occupation: Filmmaker
- Known for: The Future of Food, Symphony of the Soil
- Spouse: Jerry Garcia (m. 1994; died 1995)

Deborah Koons Garcia is an American film director, writer and producer. She is the widow of the musician Jerry Garcia.

== Career ==
Deborah Koons Garcia grew up in Ohio. She earned a BA from the University of North Carolina and an MFA from the San Francisco Art Institute.

Garcia began her directorial career with A Little Crazy in 1995. She gained further notoriety with her award winning film The Future of Food, which involved the investigation into the truth behind unlabeled genetically engineered foods that have been present within the U.S. food market for the past decade. The concept for the film came after her series “All About Babies,” which examined the first two years of a newborn baby’s life. The film presents many ethical and scientific concerns, most of which relate to genetically engineered foods, biodiversity and Monsanto's prosecution of Canadian farmers.

In 2012, Garcia directed the documentary film Symphony of the Soil. The film explores soil, from its complex role in the environment to its relationship with humans.

== Filmography ==
Filmography
Title	Year	Director	Writer	Producer
A Little Crazy	1995	check	check	check
The Future of Food	2004	check	check	check
Soil in a Good Heart	2008	check	check	
Sekem Vision	2011	check		
Portrait of a Winemaker	2011	check		
Transition Town Totnes	2011	check		
Symphony of the Soil	2012	check	check	

== Bibliography ==
- Deborah Koons Garcia. The Future of Food. Taproot Journal. 2009
- T.J. Hoban. The Future of Food Written and Directed by Deborah Koons Garcia. Nature Biotechnology, 23, 3, 295-296. 2005
- Deborah Koons and Christine Mlot. Invasive Species: Alaska. Cambridge, MA: Union of Concerned Scientists, 2009
