= David H. Baker (animal nutritionist) =

Animal nutritionist

David Hiram Baker
- Baker in 2006
- Born: February 26, 1939; Waterman, Illinois
- Died: December 2, 2009; Urbana, Illinois
- Citizenship: American
- Education: University of Illinois at Urbana-Champaign
- Known for: Animal nutrition
- Spouse(s): Lois Elder, Norraine Baker
- Children: 6
- Awards: Elected to the National Academy of Sciences
- Scientific career
- Fields: nutrition
- Workplaces: University of Illinois at Urbana-Champaign
- Thesis: Qualitative and Quantitative Evaluation of the Amino Acid Needs of Adult Swine for Maintenance. (1965)
- Doctoral advisor: D.E. (Gene) Becker

David Hiram Baker (February 26, 1939 – December 2, 2009) was an American animal nutritionist and professor at the University of Illinois at Urbana-Champaign. Baker was elected to the United States National Academy of Sciences in 2005. He served as the acting head of the Department of Animal Sciences from 1988-1990 and became Emeritus Professor at the University of Illinois in 1999 at the age of 60.

In 1987, Baker received the National Academy of Sciences' Distinguished Service Award. In 2007, he was awarded the Charles A. Black Award by the Council for Agricultural Science and Technology (CAST). He contributed to protein-amino acid nutrition, trace mineral, phosphorus utilization and vitamin bioavailability research. His work led to the establishment of nutritional requirements for commercial diets for various animal species. In addition to the Charles A. Black Award, he received the ASN Dannon Award for mentoring in 2003.

== Early life and education ==
Baker was born on February 26, 1939 in Waterman, Illinois to Vernon and Lucille Baker. Raised in a small farming town of 1,000 people, he graduated from high school in 1956 and credited his interest in nutrition largely to his mother. Baker earned his BS, MS, and Ph.D. degree from the University of Illinois at Urbana-Champaign in 1961, 1963 and 1965. His thesis was titled Qualitative and Quantitative Evaluation of the Amino Acid Needs of Adult Swine for Maintenance.

== Career and research ==
After his Ph.D., he spent two years at Eli Lilly and Company in Indianapolis, Indiana then returned to his alma mater in the Department of Animal Sciences and Division of Nutritional Sciences. Baker published 510 peer reviewed research papers and over 400 popular articles and abstracts with the help of 57 graduate and five post-doctoral students. Baker was both a speaker and consultant within and outside of North America. He delivered over 300 lectures and consulted for more than a dozen companies. He remained active in research after retiring from the University of Illinois in 1999 until his death in 2009.

He worked on research for amino acid metabolism in multiple animal species and refined the concept of the 'ideal protein' model used for formulating chicken and pig food which remains in use throughout the world today. Baker received over 25 awards, both nationally and internationally, for his work with animal nutrition. He served on the Editorial Board of the Journal of Nutrition from 1976-1980 and 1989-1998, and on the ASN council from 1989-1992.

== Personal life and death ==
Baker married Norraine Baker in 1982 and the couple had 6 children. He enjoyed fishing and doing building projects for his house along with neighbors.

Baker died from cancer on December 2, 2009 in his home in Urbana, Illinois at the age of 70.
