= American Meat =

American Meat is a 2013 documentary film which explores contemporary cattle, hog, and chicken production contrasting industrial meat production with that of small, grass-based organic farms and the sourcing of meat locally. It features Joel Salatin, Fred Kirschenmann, Chuck Wirtz, and Steve Ells of Chipotle. It was directed by Graham Meriwether.
