= Leopold Center for Sustainable Agriculture =

Iowa State University center

The Leopold Center for Sustainable Agriculture (LCSA) is a center at Iowa State University devoted to the study and promotion of new techniques in sustainable agriculture. The goals of the Center are: “to identify and develop new ways to farm profitably while conserving natural resources as well as reducing negative environmental and social impacts.” It is considered “one of the top institutions supporting research on agricultural techniques that prioritize sustainability and conservation in the context of profitable farming.”

== History ==
The center is named for Aldo Leopold, a native of Burlington, Iowa.

It was created in 1987 as part of the Iowa Groundwater Protection Act, for which Representative Paul Johnson was the Iowa House floor manager.

Between 1987 and 2017, the Center awarded more than 500 research grants to study agriculture issues like conservation buffers, rotational grazing, and building local food economies. While Leopold's focus is on Iowa's specific food and farm landscape, many of its findings have had a national and international impact.

About 75 to 85 percent of the Iowa's nutrient reduction strategies have come through the Leopold Center. Its research on cover crops, buffer strips, saturated buffers, bioreactors and wetlands and other practices has been widely used to offset nutrient and soil losses.

Mark Rasmussen is the current Leopold Center director. A 17-member Advisory Board advises the director on policies, budget, and program review.

The center funded a robotic mechanical weeder project that aims to build a lightweight, energy-efficient, ATV-size robot that could destroy weeds without chemicals in row crops. The energy cost could be less than one fifth of the energy required in conventional weeding.

== Budget cuts ==
In 2017, the Leopold Center was defunded in budget cuts made by Iowa's state government. Without state funds, the center will no longer offer grants to academic researchers, working farmers, or field-to-table advocacy programs. Students at ISU will no longer be able to receive financial support for advanced degrees in sustainable agriculture. Due to the cuts, five of the center's staff members were let go, leaving just director Rasmussen and distinguished fellow Fred Kirschenmann. The Center moved into a smaller office and downsized 30 years of records. They received a commitment from ISU, to keep the center's website up with all past research searchable in the university database.

Many believe the influence of agribusiness on legislators leads to a lack of willingness to support the center. A grassroots coalition of current students of the ISU Graduate Program in Sustainable Agriculture, emeritus faculty and alumni of ISU, farmers, and members of Iowa Farmers Union, Iowa Environmental Council, Center for Rural Affairs, Women, Food and Agriculture Network, ISU Sustainable Agriculture Student Association, and Practical Farmers of Iowa was formed to revive the center and to educate the public of Center's mission and activities.

The legislation was introduced by state representatives Charles Isenhart and Beth Wessel-Kroeschell to fund the center. The bill would make $1 million in annual public funding available to the center if ISU's president first raised the same amount in private funds. Together, the $2 million would equal the Leopold Center's pre-cutback budget.
