= Jayson Lusk =

American economist

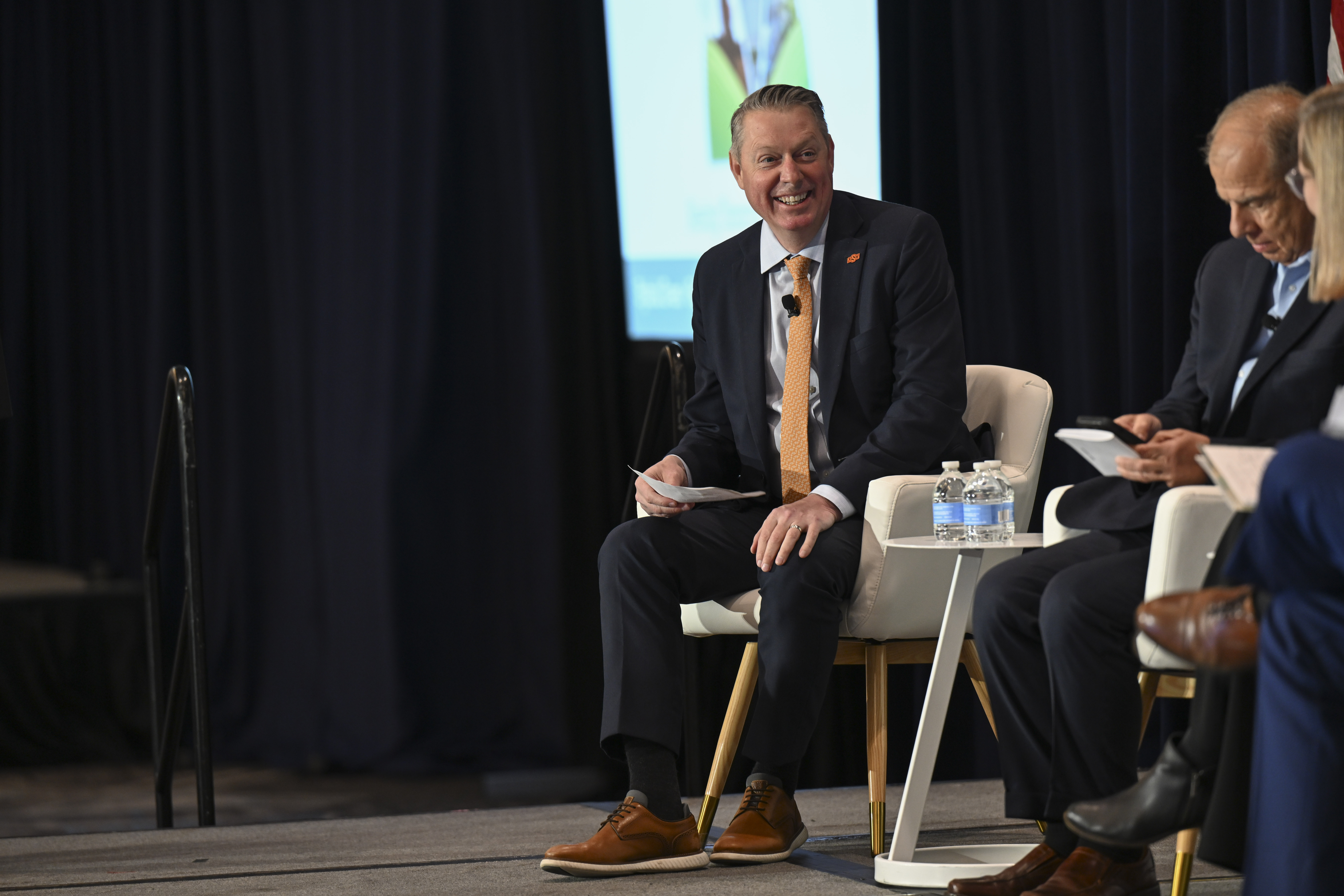
- Lusk in 2025
- Born: 1974 (age 51–52)
- Education: Texas Tech University (BS); Kansas State University (PhD)
- Occupations: Agricultural economist, academic administrator, author
- Employer: Oklahoma State University
- Known for: Research on agricultural economics and food policy
- Title: Vice President and Dean, Division of Agricultural Sciences and Natural Resources
- Awards: Borlaug CAST Communication Award (2018)

Jayson Lusk (born 1974) is vice president and Dean of the Division of Agricultural Sciences and Natural Resources at Oklahoma State University. Prior to that position, he served as Distinguished Professor and Department Head in the Department of Agricultural Economics at Purdue University. He authors books and articles related to contemporary food policy issues.

Lusk is a Fellow and Past President of the Agricultural & Applied Economics Association, Fellow of the American Society for the Advancement of Science, and a recipient of the Borlaug CAST Communication Award from the Council for Agricultural Science and Technology (CAST).

== Education and career ==
Lusk received his B.S. in Food Technology in 1997, from Texas Tech University, and his Ph.D. from Kansas State University in Agricultural Economics. Lusk began his career as assistant professor at Mississippi State University and then associate professor at Purdue University from 2000 to 2005. From 2005 to 2013 Lusk was Professor and Willard Sparks Endowed Chair at Oklahoma State University, Department of Agricultural Economics. During that time he also was a Visiting Researcher at the French National Institute for Agricultural Research. From 2017 until 2023, Lusk served as Distinguished Professor and Head of Purdue University, Department of Agricultural Economics.

Over his career, Lusk has published over 200 peer-reviewed articles in academic journals, including the Economic Journal, the American Journal of Agricultural Economics, and Journal of Environmental Economics and Management. Lusk's first popular press book The Food Police: A Well-fed Manifesto about the Politics of Your Plate criticized modern food policies as being intrusive. He frequently appears in the popular press such as Fox News to discuss research related to food. His second book Unnaturally Delicious: How Science and Technology are Serving Up Super Foods to Save the World describes how Lusk believes that changes in food technology can save the planet.

== Awards ==
Lusk is a Fellow and Past President of the Agricultural & Applied Economics Association. He is a fellow of the American Association for the Advancement of Science. In 2018, he was awarded the Borlaug CAST Communication Award by the Council for Agricultural Science and Technology (CAST).

== Books ==
- Unnaturally Delicious: How Science and Technology are Serving Up Super Foods to Save the World. 2016. St. Martin's Press. ISBN 978-1250074300.
- The Food Police: A Well-Fed Manifesto About the Politics of Your Plate. 2013. Crown Forum. ISBN 978-0307987037.
- Compassion, by the Pound: The Economics of Farm Animal Welfare, with F. Bailey Norwood. 2011. Oxford University Press. ISBN 978-0199551163.
- Oxford Handbook of the Economics of Food Consumption an Policy, edited with Jutta Roosen and Jason Shogren. 2011. Oxford University Press. ISBN 978-0199569441.
- Experimental Auctions: Methods and Applications in Economic and Marketing Research (Quantitative Methods for Applied Economics and Business Research), with Jason Shogren. 2008. Cambridge University Press. ISBN 978-0521671248.
- Agricultural Marketing and Price Analysis, with F. Bailey Norwood. 2007. Prentice Hall. ISBN 978-0132211215.
