= Marjorie Hoy =

American entomologist and geneticist (1941–2020)

Marjorie A. Hoy
- Born: May 19, 1941; Kansas City, Kansas
- Died: June 19, 2020 (aged 79); Colorado
- Education: University of California, Berkeley; University of Kansas
- Scientific career
- Fields: Entomology, Acarology
- Workplaces: University of Florida; University of California, Berkeley
- Thesis: Diapause in the predaceous mite, Metaseiulus occidentalis (Nesbitt) (Acarina: Phytoseiidae) (1972)

Marjorie Ann Hoy (19 May 1941 – 19 June 2020) was an American entomologist and geneticist known for her work using integrated pest management (IPM) and biological control in agriculture. She was Professor and Eminent Scholar at the University of Florida, Fellow of the Royal Entomological Society of London, the American Association for the Advancement of Science, and Entomological Society of America. In 2004, she was awarded the Charles A. Black Award by the Council for Agricultural Science and Technology (CAST).

Hoy was known as a pioneer in using genetic engineering to reduce the impact of agricultural pests, including developing pesticide resistant predators to control populations of destructive pests in areas where pesticides are applied. Her books include the textbook Insect Molecular Genetics, the third edition of which was published in 2013.

== Education and career ==
Hoy was born in Kansas City, Kansas, in 1941. She earned her BA at the University of Kansas in 1963, and completed her M.S. (1966) and PhD (1972) at the University of California, Berkeley. She was Research Entomologist at the Connecticut Agricultural Experiment Station (1973–1974) and U.S. Forest Service Northeast Forest Experiment Station (1974–1976) before joining the faculty at University of California, Berkeley, where she worked from 1976 to 1992. She joined the University of Florida in 1992. She died in Colorado on June 19, 2020, aged 79.

== Books ==
- Hoy, M.A.; J.J. McKelvey Jr., eds. (1979). Genetics in Relation to Insect Management. New York: Rockefeller Foundation Press. 179 pp.
- Hoy, M.A.; G.L. Cunningham; L. Knutson, eds. (1983). Biological Control of Pests by Mites. University of California Division of Agriculture Special Publications. Berkeley. 185 pp.
- Hoy, M.A.; D.C. Herzog, eds. (1985). Biological Control in Agricultural IPM Systems. Orlando: Academic Press. 589 pp.
- Hoy, M.A. (1994). Insect Molecular Genetics. San Diego: Academic Press. ISBN 978-0-12-357490-9. 540 pp. (2nd edition, 2003; 3rd edition, 2013)
- Hoy, M.A. (2011). Agricultural Acarology: Introduction to Integrated Mite Management. CRC Press. 430 pp.
