= Fred Kirschenmann =

American agriculturalist (1935–2025)

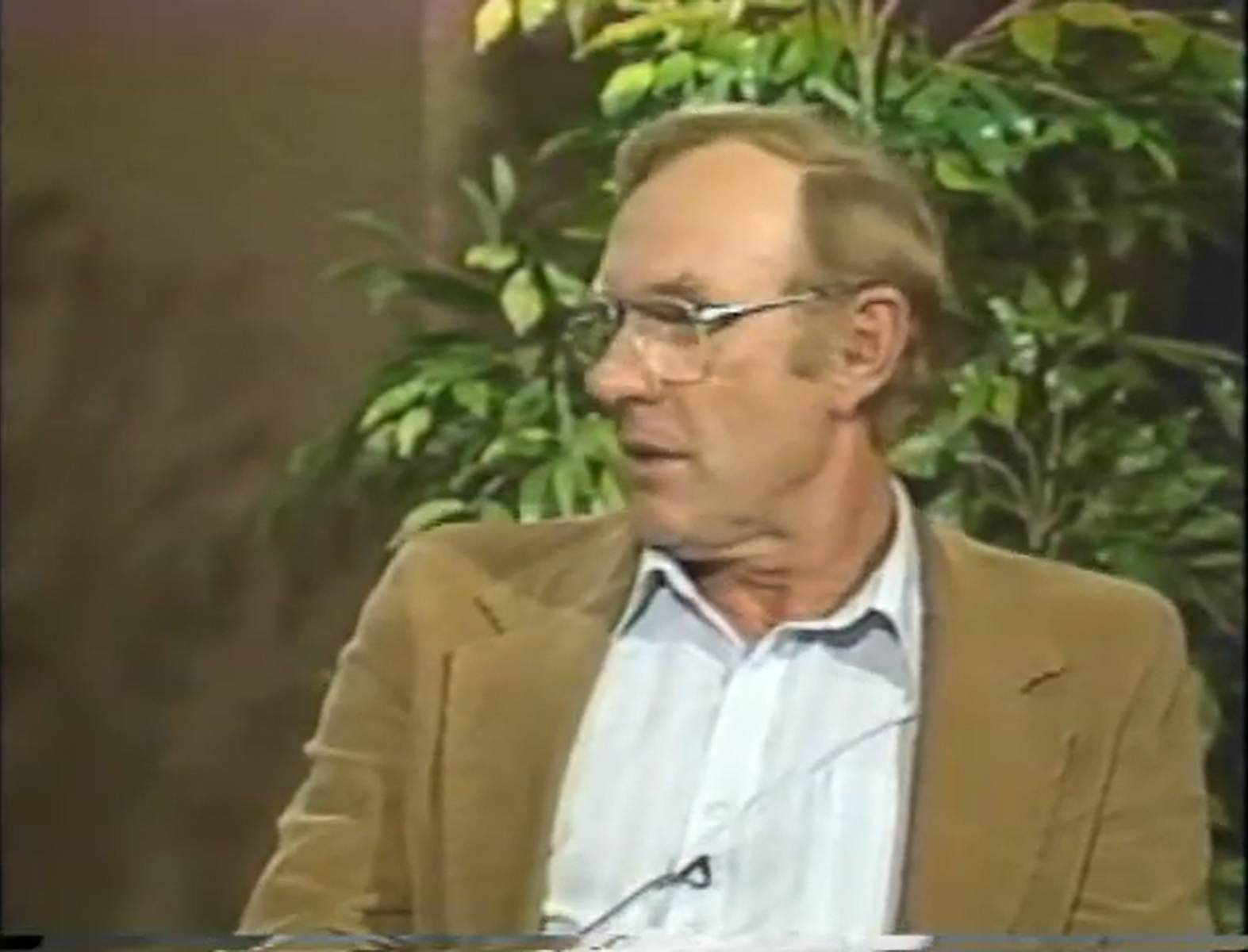
- Kirschenmann in 1990
- Born: February 4, 1935; Medina, North Dakota, US
- Died: September 13, 2025 (aged 90); Ames, Iowa, US
- Education: Yankton College; Hartford Theological Seminary; University of Chicago
- Occupations: Agriculturist, farmer
- Movement: Sustainable agriculture
- Spouse(s): Edith Marie Hults (divorced); Janet Lee Robinson (divorced); Carolyn Raffensperger
- Children: 2

Frederick Ludwig Kirschenmann (February 4, 1935 – September 13, 2025) was an American agriculturist, organic farmer and a leader in the sustainable agriculture movement. He was board president of Stone Barns Center for Food and Agriculture and the former director of the Leopold Center for Sustainable Agriculture. He is considered "one of the most prominent spokesmen for the sustainable farming movement."

== Early life and education ==
Frederick Ludwig Kirschenmann was born in Medina, North Dakota, on February 4, 1935 to a family with Russian German ancestry. He grew up on his family's farm in Streeter, North Dakota. He received his undergraduate degree at Yankton College. He attended the Hartford Theological Seminary. He earned a PhD in philosophy from the University of Chicago.

Kirschenmann began his career teaching religion and philosophy at Yankton College. He then went on to be director of the Consortium for Higher Education Religion Studies (CHERS) in Dayton, Ohio. He then became a dean at Curry College.

== Career ==
In 1970, while working as an instructor and administrator at CHERS, Kirschenmann was struck by his student David Vetter's research showing how heavy doses of nitrogen fertilizer lead to the deterioration of soil. Vetter found that the heavy use of chemical inputs in conventional farming created what he called a "chemical treadmill": "Farmers would use a pesticide, then find the next year that bugs had grown resistant, forcing them to resort to newer, more expensive products."

In 1976, after Kirschenmann's father suffered a heart attack, he offered to move back to the farm, on the condition that he could run it organically. The farm was certified organic in 1980. It is planted with diverse crops to allow for crop rotation, which has allowed him to farm productively without synthetic fertilizers or pesticides, creating a rich deep soil.

Once establishing his farm, Kirschenmann returned to academia and worked for several different nonprofit organizations in order to advance the cause of sustainable agriculture. In 1979, he helped found and served as the first president of the Northern Plains Sustainable Agriculture Society from 1983 to 1988. In 1994, he joined the board of the Henry A. Wallace Institute for Alternative Agriculture. In 1997, he became its president. He served as the director of the Leopold Center for Sustainable Agriculture from July 2000 to November 2005. He held the position of distinguished fellow.

Kirschenmann had been an advisor and been interviewed for several documentaries including American Meat, Symphony of the Soil, and Dreaming of a Vetter World. Kirschenmann was featured in the 1995 documentary My Father's Garden.

== Personal life and death ==
Kirschenmann was married to the environmental lawyer Carolyn Raffensperger. He was previously married to Edith Marie Hults and Janet Lee Robinson.

Kirschenmann had two children, Ann Marie and Damon Frederick. He died on September 13, 2025, at the age of 90. He had been ill with advanced prostate cancer.

== Awards and honors ==
Kirschenmann had received numerous honors and awards for his work, including the 2011 James Beard Foundation Leadership award, the 2012 Sustainable Agriculture Achievement Award from Practical Farmers of Iowa, the 2014 Lifetime Achievement Award from the International Federation of Organic Agriculture Movements (IFOAM), the 2014 One World Award for Lifetime Achievement, and the 2014 Thought Leader award from the Natural Resources Defense Council.

Stone Barns marked Kirschenmann's 80th birthday by launching the annual Kirschenmann Lecture at its campus. The inaugural lecture was given by writer Wendell Berry.

== Books and publications ==
In April 2010, a collection of his essays, Cultivating an Ecological Conscience: Essays from a Farmer Philosopher, was published by the University Press of Kentucky.
