= Sarah Davidson Evanega =

American academic

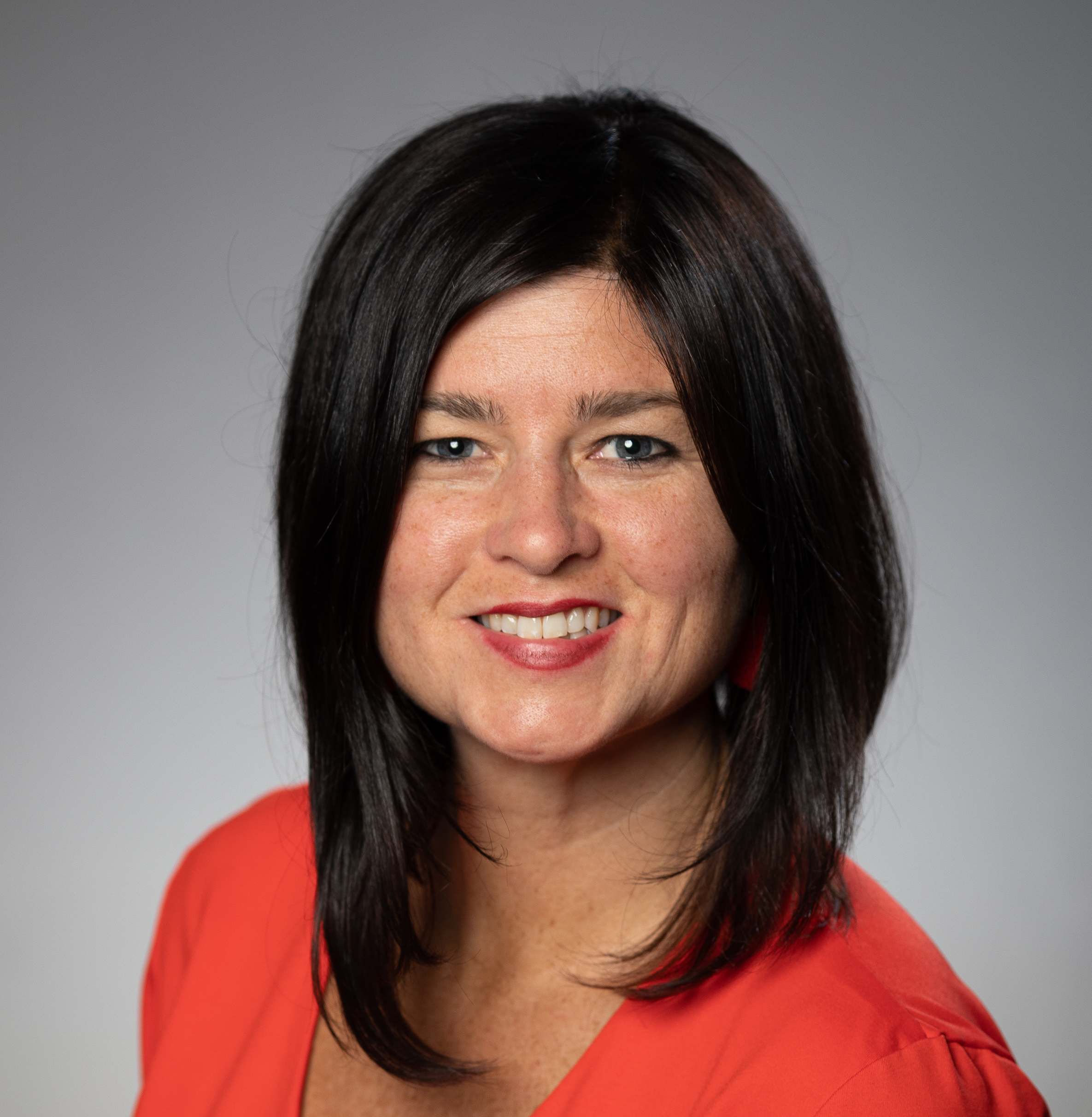
- Education: Reed College, Portland, Oregon, Bachelor of Arts Biology, 1998; Cornell University, Ithaca, New York; Master of Science (2003) and Ph.D (2009) in plant biology
- Occupations: Professor, Boyce Thompson Institute for Plant Research, (BTI) Ithaca, New York
- Known for: Science communication, especially in biotechnology

Sarah Davidson Evanega is an American researcher who works in plant sciences, a science communicator, especially relating to agricultural biotechnology. She is a professor at the Boyce Thompson Institute for Plant Research (BTI), and an adjunct professor in the School of Integrative Plant Sciences, Cornell University. She is the director of the Alliance for Science and was awarded the 2021 Borlaug CAST Communication Award.

== Education ==
Evanega began her university career at Reed College at Portland, Oregon in 1998, receiving a Bachelor of Arts degree in Biology. She received a Master of Science degree in Plant Biology in 2003, and a Ph.D. in Plant Biology, with a minor in science communication in 2009, both from Cornell University, Ithaca, NY. For her Ph.D. dissertation, she conducted a three-year study of the cultural, political, and socio-economic factors influencing the adoption of genetically modified papaya in developing countries, and wrote a story of transgenic (GMO) papaya in Thailand.

== Career ==
Evanega began her work in the College of Agriculture and Life Science, International Programs, Cornell University. From 2008 to 2016, she worked in the college's Durable Rust Resistance in Wheat Project first as Research Analyst, and then a Senior Associate Director, where she managed a 22-institution, $66 million global project aimed to protect wheat globally. During this time, she published a paper on reducing genetic vulnerability of wheat to rust.

Since 2010, Evanega worked as an International Associate Professor of Plant Breeding and Genetics (adjunct) at Cornell University, teaching courses on agricultural biotechnology at the graduate and undergraduate level. She was part of the team that developed a massive open online course (MOOC) on the science and politics of GMOs on Cornell's EdX platform. Evanega was instrumental in launching the College of Agriculture and Life Sciences initiative known as AWARE (Advancing Women in Agriculture through Research and Education), which promotes women in agriculture.

In 2014, Evanega founded the Alliance for Science, a global communications and training initiative that combats misinformation about agricultural biotechnology, climate change and other science related issues. This initiative is housed in the Boyce Thompson Institute for Plant Research (BTI), where she works as a Professor.

In January 2025, Evanega was appointed to the USDA's Fruit and Vegetable Industry Advisory Committee, for a 2 year term. As of 2025, Evanega is a vice president of business development at Okanagan Specialty Fruits. The company developed and markets Arctic Apples, a genetically modified apple.

== Science communication ==
Evanega teaches scientists, farmers and journalists and others how to communicate science effectively. She actively promotes the use of innovation in agriculture through writing papers, presenting at conferences and granting interviews. Some of the talks include: embracing science advocacy, and GMOs in a changing world.

In 2020, she led a research team that studied the main sources of coronavirus misinformation in traditional and social media, analyzing over 38 million documents to understand the root source of the COVID-19 "infodemic". The findings of this research were covered by the media including the New York Times, CNN, NBC News, The Hill and MSN.

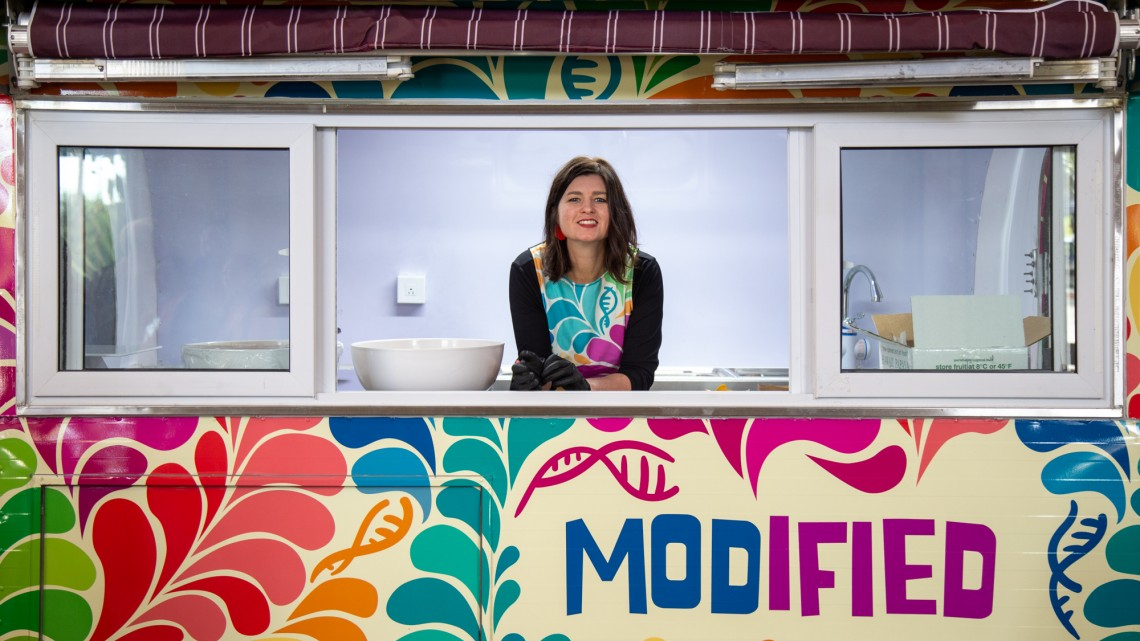
Sarah Evanega, with the “Modified” food truck

During her interview with CNN, she said that 38% of the misinformation coverage was in association with the former United States President Donald Trump. "Misinformation became a buzzword with COVID, but in plant science, we’ve been dealing with misinformation for decades,” Evanega says. “We’re not finished yet, but we have made significant progress. Now we’re seeing how we can apply learnings from agricultural biotechnology to other issues of science that suffer from misinformation.”

Evanega also launched an outreach tool, the “Modified” food truck, which travels across the country to deliver edible samples of genetically modified foods. Evanega hopes that this food truck will facilitate more evidence based conversations on the role of biotechnology in combatting climate change and food insecurity globally.

== Awards and grants ==
In May 2021, Evanega won the 2021 Borlaug CAST Communication Award, for her efforts in fighting misinformation and communicating on a variety of issues facing science, agriculture, and technology. She has also won millions of dollars in grants to support GMO and gene editing communications. Other awards and honors include:

- The Planet of Plenty Awards, "Educator" category (2020)
- Senior Fellow, The Breakthrough Institute. (2018)
- The Alice H. Cook and Constance E. Cook Award, Cornell University Office of Faculty Development & Diversity. (2015)
- Early Achievement Award, Faculty Research & Extension Awards, College of Agriculture & Life Sciences. (2014)

== Selected publications ==
Evanega has authored or co-authored over 20 academic articles centered around agricultural biotechnology, climate change and COVID-19. The following are selected articles in which Sarah Davidson Evanega is listed as the lead author.

- Evanega, S., Lynas, M., Adams, J., Smolenyak, K., & Insights, C. G. (2020). Coronavirus misinformation: quantifying sources and themes in the COVID-19 ‘infodemic’. JMIR Preprints, 19(10), 2020.
- Evanega, S. D., Singh, R. P., Coffman, R., & Pumphrey, M. O. (2014). The Borlaug Global Rust Initiative: reducing the genetic vulnerability of wheat to rust. In Genomics of plant genetic resources (pp. 317–331). Springer, Dordrecht.
- Evanega, S. D., & Lynas, M. (2015). The Dialectic of Pro-Poor Papaya. FOOD, POLITICS, AND SOCIETY, 755.
- Davidson SN. (2012) Progress, Power Prevarication, and Papaya: Local Knowledge and GE Papaya in Thailand. GM Crops & Food: Biotechnology in Agriculture and the Food Chain, 3: 104–110.
- Davidson SN. (2012) Genetically Engineered Plants. In McGraw-Hill Encyclopedia of Science & Technology, 11th edition, McGraw-Hill, New York, 2012.
- Davidson SN. (2008). Forbidden Fruit: Transgenic Papaya in Thailand. Plant Physiology, 147: 487-493

== See also ==
- Genetically modified organism
