= Kevin Folta =

American scientist and professor of the horticultural sciences

Kevin M. Folta
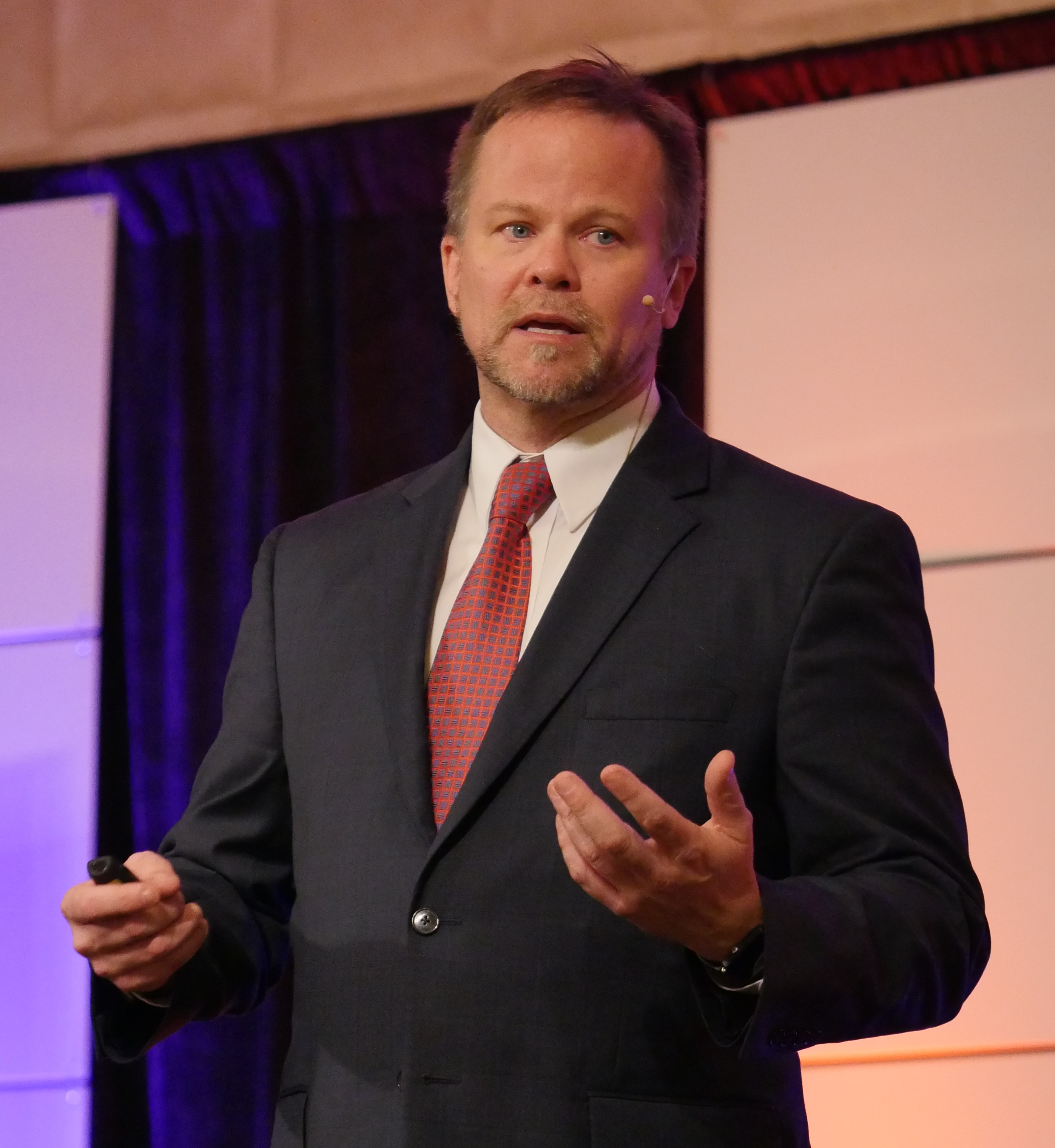
- Speaking at CSICon 2016
- Born: Chicago, Illinois
- Education: Northern Illinois University, University of Illinois at Chicago
- Known for: Light control of plant traits, novel genomics approaches, science communication
- Awards: National Science Foundation CAREER Award (2008), Howard Hughes Medical Institute Distinguished Mentor Award (2007), Borlaug CAST Communication Award (2016)
- Scientific career
- Fields: Molecular biology, horticulture, agricultural science
- Workplaces: University of Florida
- Thesis: Blue light regulation of the pea Lhcb1*4 gene in transgenic Arabidopsis thaliana (1998)
- Doctoral advisor: Lon S. Kaufman
- Other academic advisors: Edgar Spalding
- Kevin Folta's voice recorded October 2016 at CSICon
- Website: www.kevinfolta.com

Kevin M. Folta is a professor of the horticultural sciences department at the University of Florida. From 2007 to 2010 he helped lead the project to sequence the strawberry genome, and continues to research photomorphogenesis in plants and compounds responsible for flavor in strawberries. Folta has been active as a science communicator since 2002, especially relating to biotechnology. He has faced controversy over what his critics say are his industry connections. In 2017 he was elected as a fellow of the Committee for Skeptical Inquiry.

== Education and career ==
Folta received his B.S. and M.S. in biology in 1989 and 1992, respectively, from Northern Illinois University, and his Ph.D. from the University of Illinois at Chicago in molecular biology in 1998. He completed postdoctoral research at the University of Wisconsin, and joined the faculty of the horticulture department at the University of Florida in 2002. He assumed the role of Interim Department Chair in 2012 and became the chair in 2013.

=== Awards and honors ===
- Borlaug CAST Communication Award, 2016
- Northern Illinois University LA&S Golden Alumni Award (top 50 distinguished graduates), 2009
- National Science Foundation Young Faculty CAREER Award, 2008
- Committee for Skeptical Inquiry, a program of the Center for Inquiry: Fellow, 2017

== Research ==
Folta's laboratory has two primary research areas: controlling plant traits using light, and using genomics to identify molecular markers for key fruit-plant traits.

=== Plants and light ===
Folta's work with light began in 1987, while working with genes associated with the phytochrome response in plants. This research resulted in the discovery that exposure to blue light mediates specific gene responses and physiology in the plant Arabidopsis thaliana through cryptochrome and phototropin receptors.

Since then, Folta has continued this work to explore new findings in how plants grow and move in green-enriched environments, which are the challenging conditions in which plants have to grow while under the shade of other plants, and the unusual effects this produces. His work in plant biology would later extend to using light emitting diodes (LEDs) to control specific attributes of plants, such as quality, flavor, aroma, nutrition, and texture. On this, Folta says that each plant's genetic makeup gives it a certain genetic potential that can be altered by selection or genetic modification, but how this potential is reached depends on environmental conditions that can be manipulated through photomorphogenesis. He says this depends entirely on how genes that are responsible for controlling the plant's growth are activated or deactivated in response to light.

Folta believes this research would be of interest to farmers wanting to get the most genetic potential out of their crops without the need for chemicals or genetic modification, and he believes his research involving red and far-red light could be used on postharvest fruits to improve their flavor while stored in grocery stores and home refrigerators.

=== Strawberry genomics and flavors ===
Folta's work in strawberry genomics began in 2002. Folta was the contributing author in sequencing the strawberry genome in 2011. During the project, they discovered molecular markers that speed traditional breeding for enhanced flavors.

Folta's more recent work with strawberries has involved identifying the compounds responsible for taste that are present in different varieties of the fruit in order to breed these characteristics back into commercial varieties; characteristics which have been lost over time due to strawberries having been bred, traditionally, to select for disease resistance, firmness, size, and yield instead of flavor. As a result of this research, his team has identified 30 compounds present in strawberries that affect its flavor, including some that resemble other fruits such as grapes and pineapples, and 6 associated with a human's perception of sweetness. These findings can also be used for other staple plants in the rose family such as peaches, almonds, apples, raspberries, and blackberries, and contribute to a growing list of compounds that can be used in the future to produce more flavorful foods without using as much sugar. Folta's research can be used to produce more flavorful and aromatic strawberries using conventional breeding techniques, without the use of genetic modification.

== Science communication ==
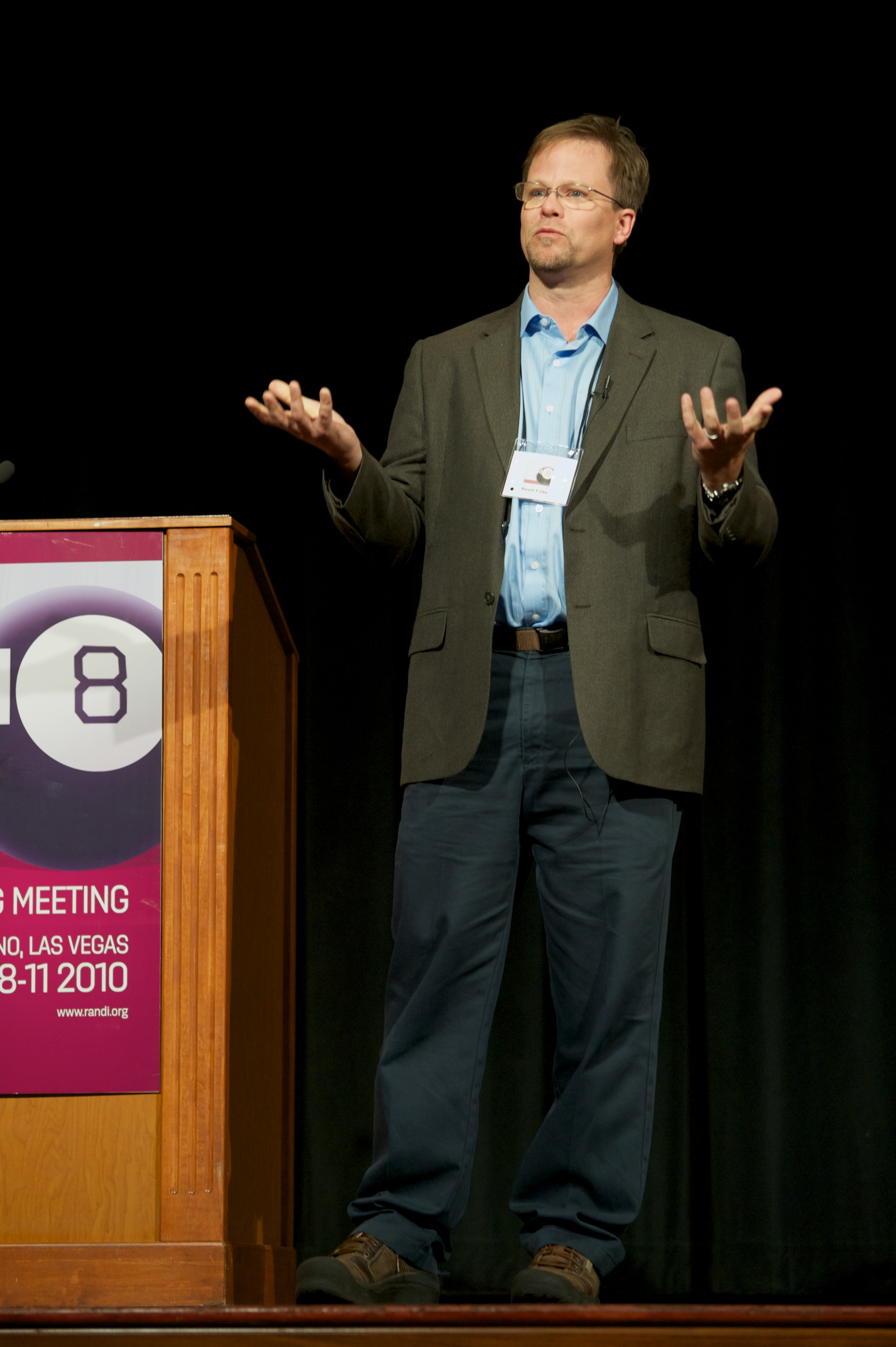
The Amaz!ng Meeting 8 in 2010

Folta has formal training in communication and has been recognized for his skill by scholarly institutions. He uses his experience to provide workshops to teach scientists and farmers how to communicate science effectively, and engages with the public through outreach programs, the internet, and other means.

Nature Biotechnology described Folta as "a gifted communicator—one of the rare scientists who has engaged the public, with over 12 years experience behind him. Not someone who merely discusses public engagement; but someone who actually communicates directly with non-expert audiences—at science fairs, in schools, at retirement homes, in blogs and podcasts."

In 2016, Folta was awarded the Borlaug CAST Communication Award by the Council for Agricultural Science and Technology (CAST), named after fellow agricultural biologist and 1970 Nobel Peace Prize winner Norman Borlaug. CAST cited Folta's ability to focus on "clear, credible information" and his use of multiple venues to engage the public, in addition to his communication workshops for scientists and farmers. Julie Borlaug, daughter of Norman Borlaug, added, "[Folta] has not shied away from controversial subjects and has often been the number one target of the anti-science movement on behalf of all of us who support biotechnology." Writing about the award in The Des Moines Register, Jack Payne, University of Florida's senior vice president for agriculture and natural resources and leader of the Institute of Food and Agricultural Sciences, praised Folta for his dedication to science communication and willingness to speak to all audiences about food biotechnology. Payne wrote that Folta "wants to replace fear with fact" to counteract misinformation about biotechnology and its use in food production.

Folta has considered his outreach efforts among his proudest achievements, and stated that his most important contributions to science "won't come out of my lab. They'll come out of my mouth."

When you see what it takes to produce a tomato—the number of people involved from breeding all the way to post-harvest, people who pick it, out in the hot sun, really doing really tough work, the huge amounts of fuel and labor that are involved—that I can buy this thing for 50 cents? It amazes me ... It blows me away that we take this for granted.

— Kevin Folta, Science Enthusiast Podcast (August 31, 2016)

=== Views ===
Folta has been active in the public discussion of politically controversial topics such as evolution, climate change, vaccines, and agricultural biotechnology since 2002. He views a disconnect between science and the public's understanding, and believes a priority should be given to increase public awareness and "give scientists the tools to effectively participate at that interface." He believes that communication between scientists and the public is increasingly important: "In 2050, we will look back at this age as a time when our command of biology changed. From being able to manipulate viruses to attack cancer, to precision-change genetic information in a cell, to tweaking a gene and making a crop immune to a disease—breakthroughs like this are real and gaining momentum."

He has compared the scientific consensus regarding the safety of genetically modified foods to those regarding global warming and vaccines. He is an outspoken critic of food blogger Vani Hari's claims about the alleged dangers of certain food additives that regulators generally recognize as safe. Folta advocates for a "soft and effective" approach in handling anti-GMO activists, believing overly inflammatory responses from the scientific community will alienate the public audience. Folta regards the term "GMO" as imprecise and not as descriptive as the term "genetic engineering". His supportive view is also expressed in an interview at CSICon made by Jonathan Jarry, recalling Kevin Folta's recent visit to Uganda where he saw Ugandan scientists using genetic engineering to solve a food crisis, although initially being denied the use of this technology.

As an example of the importance of public education, Folta says of the changes in crop technology: "Gene editing is this method of changing a single base (or maybe a few bases) of targeted DNA in an amazingly precise way. And unlike the old methods of genetic engineering that left some of the hardware of the process in the cell, the new methods can yield tiny alterations that solve a problem with a precision change. While scientists celebrate the technology and see it as a way to precision-breed new plants and animals, activists call it the most 'dangerous and insidious form of screwing with nature known to man'."

=== Podcasting ===
Folta operates the Talking Biotech podcast which is billed as "A science-based assessment of new technology and the future of food", in which he interviews agriculture scientists and experts in the fields of science and communication to discuss the genetic improvement of plants, animals, and microbes and other issues in biotechnology.

He has also created the Science Power Hour podcast, which is a parody of an AM talk radio show hosted by Folta's alter ego "Vern Blazek". Folta describes the show as an attempt to deliver science communication in an entertaining way that would appeal to a more general audience, and as a way to convey serious topics using humor.

Kevin Folta has been a guest on numerous other podcasts such as SHARKFARMER, Talk Nerdy, Heartland Daily Podcast, Food and Farm, Science for the People, Vegan Chicago, The Joe Rogan Experience, and The Skeptics' Guide to the Universe.

== Conflict of interest allegations ==
In February 2015, US Right to Know (USRTK), an Oakland, California-based group whose sole major funder is the Organic Consumers Association, filed a Freedom of Information Act (FOIA) request to the University of Florida as part of a campaign targeting the emails of public scientists who have spoken out in favor of biotechnology. USRTK was concerned that scientists such as Folta may have been pressured by food and agricultural companies into claiming that GMOs are safe. The university released documents which indicated that Folta had not committed any scientific misconduct. Folta told Science that he was willing to comply, but was concerned with how USRTK would use the information and how his emails could be taken out of context and used to "smear" him.

In a Nature article from August 2015 Keith Kloor wrote that Folta had "close ties to Monsanto and other biotechnology interests". Folta denied these claims, and wrote that the accusation was based on a few dozen emails, three professional direct interactions over thirteen years, and a reimbursement of customary travel expenses by Monsanto for $719.76, covering airfare, a rental car, 2 hotel nights, and parking for one event to speak to farmers in Colorado in September 2014. Folta has maintained that he has always communicated information consistently according to his research and understanding as a scientist working for a public institution.

In September 2015, Eric Lipton writing for The New York Times reported that the agriculture industry had enlisted academics, including Folta, to use their "independent voices" to advocate for public perception and policy, which appeared favorable to the industry. He reported that the University of Florida had received a $25,000 grant from Monsanto to be used at the university's discretion which was earmarked for an established biotechnology communication program. Folta submitted expense reports to use the biotechnology communication fund to pay for travel expenses, a small projector, coffee and food. Most of these expenses had since been reimbursed to the fund with honoraria from his talks and private donations from individuals and small businesses, while none of the donation from Monsanto was used. In response to the controversy and personal threats against Folta and his family, the university offered to return the donation, which Monsanto refused; instead, funds were redirected to a university food pantry. Folta has promised a complete accounting for his research and extension activities, which he says "defines a new standard of transparency and a new tool to cultivate trust" he hopes other scientists and advocates will adopt.

In October 2015, Nature Biotechnology wrote that scientists like Folta have been "targeted because they speak inconvenient truths about GM technology" and stated that the funds "were tied neither to [Folta] directly nor to his research. His conflict of interest disclosures were wholly compliant with his university's rules. He never used industry funds for personal gain." The journal criticized the journalists for "cherry-picking" and creating "hostile environments [for scientists] that threaten vibrant rare species with extinction."

Many experts were highly critical of the move by USRTK. Jack Payne, head of the University of Florida's Institute of Food and Agricultural Sciences, characterized this as an example of activist groups attempting to silence scientists who wish to engage in public discussion of politically controversial topics, describing it as a "spiral of silence". Gretchen Goldman, writing for the Union of Concerned Scientists (UCS), a nonprofit science advocacy organization, criticized the FOIA requests for being "overly wide", saying it would create "chilling effects on researchers and confuse the public about the state of the science." Nina Fedoroff, Peter Raven, and Phillip Sharp, three former presidents of the American Association for the Advancement of Science, wrote in The Guardian comparing the USRTK's use of FOIA against scientists to "Climategate" and criticized the organization backing them for "promoting the interests of the organic food business", calling their activities "anti-science". Ralph Nader expressed support for the use of FOIA requests on scientists, calling them "appropriate subjects".

Professor and science communicator Steven Novella wrote that "The shill witch hunt is just getting started, and now they are emboldened by the PR bonanza they have found in FOIA requests for e-mails. All of this is likely to have a chilling effect on scientists speaking out in the public square on controversial issues."

In 2018, Folta sued The New York Times for defamation, following the Times' coverage of Folta's connections to agriculture companies. Folta's lawsuit was dismissed by the court in 2019.

== Personal life ==
He trained and competed in karate for many years, and he won a bronze medal in kumite (sparring) at the 2012 USA National Karate-do Federation national tournament (over 45 Masters division).

== Bibliography ==
- 2009 Genetics and Genomics of Rosaceae : Springer International Publishing : edited by Kevin M. Folta, Susan E. Gardiner : ISBN 978-0-387-77490-9
- 2011 Genetics, Genomics and Breeding of Berries : CRC Press : edited by Kevin M. Folta, Chittaranjan Kole : ISBN 978-1-57808-707-5
- 2018 Pseudoscience: The Conspiracy Against Science "Food-o-science Pseudoscience: The Weapons and Tactics in the War on Crop Biotechnology" :MIT Press: edited by Allison B. Kaufman, James C. Kaufman: ISBN 9780262037426
