= Per Pinstrup-Andersen =

Danish economist

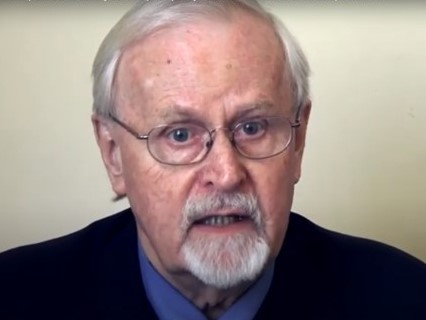
Per Pinstrup-Andersen (2015)

Per Pinstrup-Andersen (born 7 April 1939) is a Danish economist and a Professor Emeritus at Cornell University. Before retiring in 2013, he was the Howard Edward Babcock Professor of Food, Nutrition and Public Policy and the J. Thomas Clark Professor of Entrepreneurship at Cornell University. In 1992–2002, Pinstrup-Andersen was the Director General of the International Food Policy Research Institute. Pinstrup-Andersen received his PhD in 1969 from Oklahoma State University. He is a recipient of both the Charles A. Black Award and the World Food Prize.

== Research and impact ==
In 1998, Pinstrup-Andersen was awarded the Charles A. Black Award by the Council for Agricultural Science and Technology (CAST). In 2001 Pinstrup-Andersen won the World Food Prize for personally initiating the research effort which enabled several governments to reform their food subsidy programs and dramatically increase food availability to the severely impoverished.

The research that Pinstrup-Andersen initiated laid the foundation for the establishment of "Food For Education" programs in which the families receive food subsidies when children stay in school. Pinstrup-Andersen initiated a global effort to uplift those most at risk by formulating International Food Policy Research Institute's 2020 Vision Initiative which helped reverse the trend of decreasing global developmental assistance, and led to actions which have brought about an important reduction in world hunger and poverty levels.
