= Shahid Naeem =

American ecologist and conservation biologist

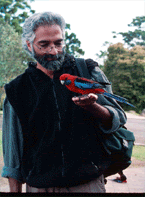
- Born: California
- Education: UC Berkeley(BAc),(MAc),(PhD)
- Occupation: Professor
- Honours: ISI Highly Cited Author (2003, 2014, 2015, 2016); Fellow of the American Association for the Advancement of Science (2003)
- Scientific career
- Fields: Ecology, conservation biology, community ecology
- Institutions: Columbia University, University of Minnesota, University of Washington, University of Michigan
- Website: http://naeemlab.com/

Shahid Naeem is an American ecologist and conservation biologist who is a Lenfest Distinguished professor and chair in the Department of Ecology, Evolution, and Environmental Biology at Columbia University. Naeem is the author of Biodiversity, Ecosystem Functioning, and Human Well-Being, and has published over 100 scientific articles.

== Early life and education ==
Shahid Naeem was born in California and grew up in Bedford-Stuyvesant, a neighborhood of New York City. Growing up in New York City, Naeem was exposed to science and nature through museums, botanical gardens, and conservatories. Naeem considered becoming a doctor or illustrator, but ultimately decided to pursue a career in science as an ecologist and professor.

Naeem returned to California to complete his undergraduate degree, M.A., and Ph.D. at University of California, Berkeley. After earning his Ph.D. in Zoology, Naeem worked as a postdoctoral fellow at the University of Michigan, the University of Copenhagen, and the Imperial College of London.

== Career and research ==
Naeem worked as a faculty member at the University of Minnesota and the University of Washington before he joined the Columbia University faculty in 2003. He is the former department chair and a professor in the Department of Ecology, Evolution, and Environmental Biology at Columbia University. In 2008, Naeem was honored as a Lenfest Distinguished Columbia Faculty, an award that recognizes excellent teaching, scholarship, and mentorship.

He operates an ecology research laboratory at Columbia University with Matt Palmer, dubbed “Ecology With No Apology.” They have three lab mottos: “Never apologize for the truth! Eschew obfuscation! Do what you gotta do and stay fly!” Their lab focuses on researching plants, animals, and microorganisms in a plethora of ecosystems. Naeem is interested in understanding how ecosystems are disrupted by the removal of a native species or the introduction of an invasive species. He believes that biodiversity loss is the most significant impediment to environmental sustainability and ecological health.

Naeem's research was prominent in shifting ecologists' focus on the importance of biodiversity conservation for the sake of conservation, to an expanded perspective that emphasizes the importance of biodiversity in maintaining ecosystem health and stability.

Naeem is also the director of science at the Earth Institute Center for Environmental Sustainability. Under this role, he works to develop research programs with a consortium that includes the American Museum of Natural History, the New York Botanical Garden, the Wildlife Conservation Society and the Wildlife Trust.

=== Awards and honors ===
Naeem received the Buell and Mercer Award from the Ecological Society of America. Naeem is an Aldo Leopold Leadership fellow and Fellow of the American Association for the Advancement of Science. Naeem's work has been influential in the field of ecology and conservation sciences. In 2014, Reuters named Shahid Naeem as one of the world's most influential scientific minds for ecological and environmental sciences.

- 1985/1986 - UC Regents Fellowship
- 1985/1986 - Noyes Tropical Research Fellowship
- 1987 - Driscoll Fellowship, University of Minnesota
- 1988 - Murray F. Buell Award for best Graduate Student Paper at Ecological Society of America Meetings
- 1991 - NATO Postdoctoral Fellowship
- 1989/1990 - Offered Smithsonian Research Institute Fellowship
- 1998/1991 - Michigan Society of Fellows Postdoctoral Fellowship, University of Michigan, Ann Arbor
- 1995 - George Mercer Award for Best Ecological Paper by Younger Ecologist, Ecological Society of America
- 2001 - Aldo Leopold Leadership Fellow
- 2003 - Fellow of the American Association for the Advancement of Science
- 2003 - Elected, Member at Large, Ecological Society of America
- 2003 - ISI Highly Cited Author
- 2008 - Lenfest Prize, Columbia University
- 2014/15/16 - ISI Highly Cited Author

Naeem's research from Columbia University has been funded by the National Science Foundation:

- 2013 NSF Grant, Columbia Technology, Research, and Ecology Exchange for Students.
- 2013 NSF Grant, Columbia Dissertation Research: The Impacts of Farmer Adaptation to Climate Variability on Groundwater Salinity and Soil Health in Gujarat, India.
- 2014 NSF Grant, Gk-12 Columbia University Learning From Earth and Ecological Field Studies (LEEFS) Graduate Fellowship Program.

=== Publications ===
- Ecosystem Functioning, and Human Well-Being (2009)
- Sustainable Food Production: A primer for the 21st Century and Biodiversity (2021)
- Costanza, Robert; d'Arge, Ralph; de Groot, Rudolf; Farber, Stephen; Grasso, Monica; Hannon, Bruce; Limburg, Karin; Naeem, Shahid; O'Neill, Robert V.; Paruelo, Jose; Raskin, Robert G.; Sutton, Paul; van den Belt, Marjan (May 1997). "The value of the world's ecosystem services and natural capital". Nature. 387 (6630): 253–260. Bibcode:1997Natur.387..253C. doi:10.1038/387253a0. S2CID 672256.
- Naeem, Shahid; Thompson, Lindsey J.; Lawler, Sharon P.; Lawton, John H.; Woodfin, Richard M. (April 1994). "Declining biodiversity can alter the performance of ecosystems". Nature. 368 (6473): 734–737. Bibcode:1994Natur.368..734N. doi:10.1038/368734a0. S2CID 4305254.
- Loreau, M.; Naeem, S.; Inchausti, P.; Bengtsson, J.; Grime, J. P.; Hector, A.; Hooper, D. U.; Huston, M. A.; Raffaelli, D.; Schmid, B.; Tilman, D.; Wardle, D. A. (26 October 2001). "Biodiversity and Ecosystem Functioning: Current Knowledge and Future Challenges". Science. 294 (5543): 804–808. Bibcode:2001Sci...294..804L. doi:10.1126/science.1064088. PMID 11679658. S2CID 30688.
- Cardinale, Bradley J.; Duffy, J. Emmett; Gonzalez, Andrew; Hooper, David U.; Perrings, Charles; Venail, Patrick; Narwani, Anita; Mace, Georgina M.; Tilman, David; Wardle, David A.; Kinzig, Ann P.; Daily, Gretchen C.; Loreau, Michel; Grace, James B.; Larigauderie, Anne; Srivastava, Diane S.; Naeem, Shahid (June 2012). "Biodiversity loss and its impact on humanity" (PDF). Nature. 486 (7401): 59–67. Bibcode:2012Natur.486...59C. doi:10.1038/nature11148. PMID 22678280. S2CID 4333166.
- Balmford, Andrew; Bruner, Aaron; Cooper, Philip; Costanza, Robert; Farber, Stephen; Green, Rhys E.; Jenkins, Martin; Jefferiss, Paul; Jessamy, Valma; Madden, Joah; Munro, Kat; Myers, Norman; Naeem, Shahid; Paavola, Jouni; Rayment, Matthew; Rosendo, Sergio; Roughgarden, Joan; Trumper, Kate; Turner, R. Kerry (9 August 2002). "Economic Reasons for Conserving Wild Nature". Science. 297 (5583): 950–953. Bibcode:2002Sci...297..950B. doi:10.1126/science.1073947. PMID 12169718. S2CID 18615499.

Naeem is the author of a Sustainable Food Production: A primer for the 21st Century and Biodiversity, Ecosystem Functioning, and Human Well-Being, and has published over 100 scientific articles. Ecosystem Functioning, and Human Well-Being complies and summarizes over 900 scientific studies on how biodiversity loss impacts the environment and human society.

Naeem's research has shifted the traditional view of conservation biology, towards looking at conservation as a means of ecosystem restoration and stability. Naeem's work on conservation biology extended beyond needing to save an isolated species, and focused on how those species exist in their ecosystem and how they are necessary for ecosystem function. Naeem has contributed to advancing scientific knowledge and literature including but not limited to the fields of ecology, ecosystem ecology, community ecology, biodiversity conservation, and evolutionary biology. He has been awarded with the ISI Highly Cited Author in 2003, 2014, 2015, 2016.

== Public engagement ==
Naeem is an active science communicator, working to make science accessible to and engaging to the general public. As a well known biodiversity and ecology researcher and academic, he has provided expertise and interviews on multiple PBS SciTech Now segments to explain scientific concepts such as biodiversity and extinction. He has also been interviewed by establishments such as The Atlantic and Landscape News to provide explanations how biodiversity loss impacts environmental health.

== Other interests and public life ==
Naeem seriously considered being an illustrator instead of a scientist. He worked part time as a laboratory technician in an ecology lab through the University of California, Berkeley while pursuing a career as an illustrator. His experience in the laboratory convinced him to pursue a Ph.D. in science and education (which he later switched to a Ph.D. in zoology). Despite choosing to pursue science over illustration, Naeem sees an interconnectedness between nature, science, and artistic expression.
