= Judith S. Stern =

American nutritionist (1943–2019)

- Born: Judith Schneider Stern; April 25, 1943; Brooklyn, New York, U.S.
- Died: May 8, 2019 (aged 76)
- Citizenship: American
- Education: Cornell University; Harvard University School of Public Health
- Known for: Obesity research; Co-founding the American Obesity Association
- Awards: Charles A. Black Award (2001)
- Scientific career
- Fields: Nutrition science; Obesity research
- Workplaces: University of California, Davis
- Doctoral advisor: Jean Mayer

Judith S. Stern (April 25, 1943 – May 8, 2019) was an American nutritionist and longtime professor at the University of California, Davis. She was known for her research on obesity. Stern was a member of the National Academy of Medicine, and co-founded the American Obesity Association. In 2001, she was awarded the Charles A. Black Award by the Council for Agricultural Science and Technology (CAST).

== Early life and education ==
Judith Schneider Stern was born in Brooklyn on April 25, 1943, and raised in Valley Stream, New York. Stern received her bachelor's degree in Food and Nutrition from Cornell University, and became certified as a registered dietitian. She then moved to Harvard University School of Public Health, completing her master's degree in 1966 and her doctoral degree in 1970, under the supervision of Jean Mayer. Following her doctoral degree, Stern began as a postdoctoral fellow in Jules Hirsch's laboratory at the Rockefeller Institute.

== Academic career ==
In 1974, Stern joined the faculty of the University of California, Davis as an assistant professor in the Department of Nutrition. There her early research centered on differences in the adipose tissue of obese individuals – using Zucker rats as a research model. Eventually her research program grew to include human studies, focused on various obesity treatment regimens.

In 1995, Stern was elected to the National Academy of Medicine. At various points she was elected president of the NAASO (1992–1993, now The Obesity Society) and the American Society for Clinical Nutrition. Stern co-founded the American Obesity Association, an advocacy group that lobbied in favor of obesity research and treatment.
