= Symphony of the Soil =

2012 film written by Deborah Koons Garcia

Symphony of the Soil is a 2012 science documentary film by Deborah Koons Garcia which explores soil, from its complex role in the environment to its relationship with humans.
