= Wingspread Conference on the Precautionary Principle =

The Wingspread Conference on the Precautionary Principle was a three-day academic conference where the precautionary principle was defined. The January 1998 meeting took place at Wingspread, headquarters of the Johnson Foundation in Racine, Wisconsin, and involved 35 scientists, lawyers, policy makers and environmentalists from the United States, Canada and Europe.

== Background ==
The formal concept evolved out of the German socio-legal tradition in the 1930s, centering on the concept of good household management. In German the concept is Vorsorgeprinzip, which translates into English as precaution principle.

Many of the concepts underpinning the precautionary principle pre-date the term's inception. For example, the essence of the principle is captured in a number of cautionary aphorisms such as "an ounce of prevention is worth a pound of cure", "better safe than sorry", and "look before you leap". The precautionary principle may also be interpreted as the evolution of the ancient medical principle of "first, do no harm" to apply to institutions and institutional decision-making processes rather than individuals.

== Final statement ==
In the final text of the agreement, it was agreed that the precautionary principle could be summarized as

When an activity raises threats of harm to human health or the environment, precautionary measures should be taken even if some cause and effect relationships are not fully established scientifically.

The members also concluded that current environmental policies do not do enough to prevent environmental disasters instead of controlling damage after an incident.

== Follow up committees ==
The February 2, 2000 European Commission Communication on the Precautionary Principle notes: "The precautionary principle applies where scientific evidence is insufficient, inconclusive or uncertain and preliminary scientific evaluation indicates that there are reasonable grounds for concern that the potentially dangerous effects on the environment, human, animal or plant health may be inconsistent with the high level of protection chosen by the EU".

The January 29, 2000 Cartagena Protocol on Biosafety says: "Lack of scientific certainty due to insufficient relevant scientific information ... shall not prevent the Party of import, in order to avoid or minimize such potential adverse effects, from taking a decision, as appropriate, with regard to the import of the living modified organism in question."
