= Melissa Perry (epidemiologist) =

American epidemiologist and microbiologist

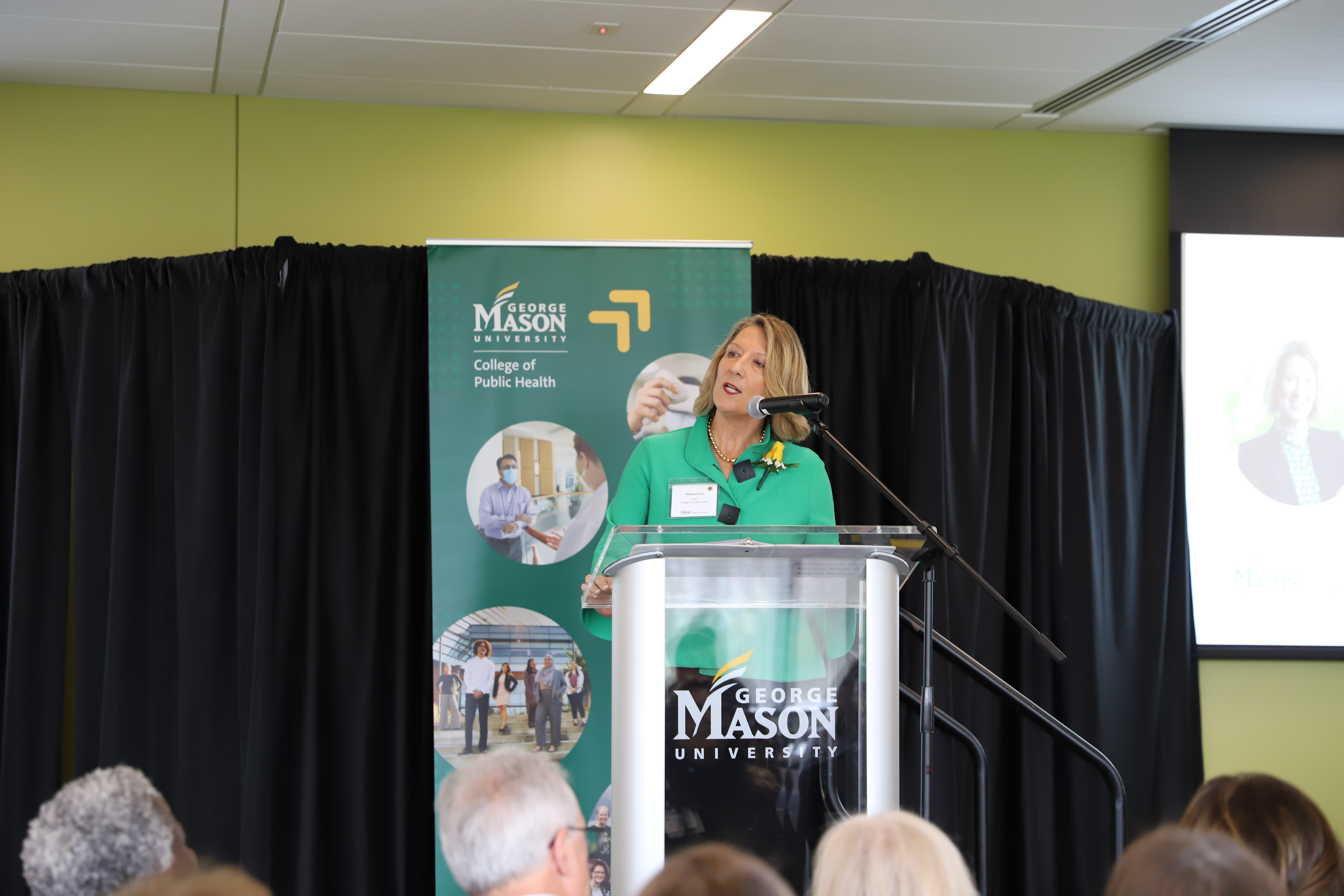
Melissa Perry speaking at Celebrate Public Health Event at George Mason University's College of Public Health

Melissa Perry is an American epidemiologist and microbiologist, who is the inaugural dean of the College of Public Health at George Mason University. Previously, she served as chair of the Department of Environmental and Occupational Health at George Washington University between 2011 and 2022. Perry was chair of the Board of Scientific Counselors for the National Center for Environmental Health/Agency for Toxic Substances and Disease Registry (NCEH/ATSDR) of the Centers for Disease Control and Prevention between 2015 and 2019. Perry was appointed to the National Academies of Sciences Engineering and Medicine (NASEM) Board on Environmental Studies and Toxicology (BEST) in 2023. In 2025, Perry was appointed as a National Academies of Sciences Engineering and Medicine (NASEM) member of the Committee on Clinical Follow-Up and Care for those Impacted by the JP-5 Releases at Red Hill.

== Education and early life ==
Perry was born in Pittsfield Massachusetts in 1966 and grew up in Northern Vermont. She received a bachelor's degree in psychology at the University of Vermont, and masters and doctoral degrees from Johns Hopkins University School of Hygiene and Public Health. In 2025, Perry graduated with her MBA from the Costello College of Business at George Mason University.

== Research work ==
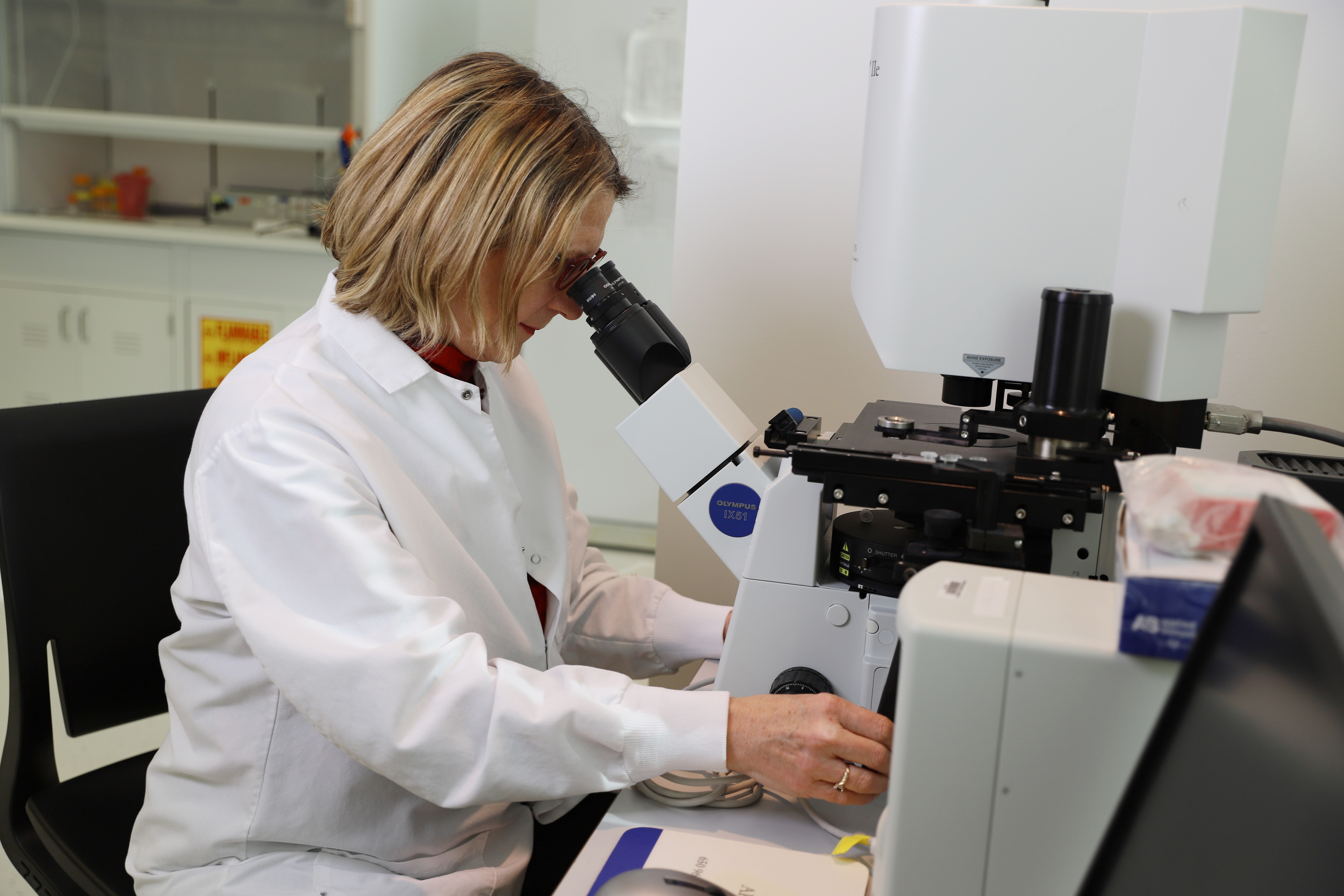
Melissa Perry conducting research at George Mason University's Science and Technology Campus

Perry spent 13 years as faculty with the department of environmental health at the Harvard School of Public Health. Her work at Harvard included conducting occupational health research on the causes of injuries in meatpacking plants, which later became important for understanding the inordinate risks faced by US meatpacking workers during the COVID-19 pandemic. In 2011, Perry was appointed chair of the Department of Environmental and Occupational Health at George Washington University. In 2022, Perry was hired as dean of the College of Public Health at George Mason University.

While chair of Environmental and Occupational Health at George Washington University Perry authored multiple papers on alleged reproductive health risks of herbicide exposure.

At George Mason University, Perry directs a lab that investigates the impact of various environmental exposures on human health, focusing on reproductive toxicity caused by pesticide exposures. While at Harvard University and subsequently at George Washington University, Perry's lab also developed new techniques for high-volume identification of chromosomal abnormalities in sperm cells. The lab has conducted multiple studies to understand the link between chromosomal abnormalities caused by environmental risk factors. In 2015, the lab was involved in conducting the first large scale epidemiological study to look at organophosphate poisoning and chromosomal abnormalities in adult men.

Research from the lab provided extensive evidence showing automated methods are superior to manual methods for estimating sex chromosome disomy through fluorescence in situ hybridization (FISH) techniques. The lab also published the largest study to date to provide estimates of sex chromosome disomy among men attending fertility clinics. Lab members have investigated exposure to commonly used herbicides in the United States, including 2,4-D and glyphosate, neonicotinoids and have investigated environmental and reproductive health among men of color in Washington, D.C. One of Perry's most widely cited research papers was one of the first reports on the human health effects of neonicotinoids.

Perry currently writes a column for Psychology Today that covers insights on mental health and well-being called, "The Mindful Epidemiologist."

== Honors and awards ==
Perry is past co-chair of the National Academies of Sciences, Engineering, and Medicine Committee on Emerging Science and chair of the review committee of the Health Effects Institute. She is past president of the American College of Epidemiology (2014–15) and is a fellow of the Collegium Ramazzini,.

Perry was chosen to participate in the Hedwig van Ameringen Executive Leadership in Academic Medicine (ELAM) Fellowship. The ELAM program is dedicated to preparing women for senior leadership roles in schools of medicine, dentistry, public health and pharmacy. She was also a 2021 recipient of the Fulbright Scholar Fellowship to Albania to conduct research and lecture in public health capacity building. While in Albania, she delivered lectures to university students and scientists at the Albanian Institute[HC1] of Public Health, and the Albanian Academy of Sciences, where she is an honorary member.

Perry was named to Northern Virginia Magazine's 2024 list of 50 most influential people for leading the College of Public Health and named a top 2025 Health Care Innovator by Washington Business Journal for her role in technology-centered public health education.
