= Women, Food and Agriculture Network =

Non-profit organization

Women, Food and Agriculture Network (WFAN) is an American non-profit organization that provides networking, education and leadership development for women in sustainable agriculture and food systems development. Programming focused mainly in the Midwest, such as an Iowa program called "Women Caring for the Land".

== Founders ==
Its founders, Denise O'Brien and Kathy Lawrence, wanted to involve women's voices in food and agricultural policy-making.

== Organization ==
Women, Food and Agriculture Network started as an organization in 1997. Its establishment grew out of concerns about systemic rural, agricultural, and environmental problems and gender relations in these domains.

== Growth ==
Since that time, WFAN has grown to a community of more than 1,200 women and men worldwide who share information and support each other's work through a listserv, newsletter and periodic gatherings. It works with women farmland owners, beginning and transitioning women farmers, and established women farmers to provide networking, information and support.
