= Practical Farmers of Iowa =

- Formation: 1985
- Founded: 1985
- Founder: Dick & Sharon Thompson, Larry Kallem
- Type: Nonprofit
- Purpose: Sustainable Agriculture
- Location: Ames, Iowa
- Region served: Iowa
- Method: Research, Develop, Promote

Practical Farmers of Iowa (also known as PFI or Practical Farmers) is a non-profit farmer-led organization with over 9,000 members from Iowa and beyond. Farmers in their network raise corn, soybeans, hay, livestock large and small, horticultural crops from fruits and vegetables to cut flowers and herbs, and more. Members have conventional and organic systems; employ diverse management practices; run operations of all sizes; and come from a range of backgrounds. The organization coordinates farmer-led training, connects researchers and farmers, provides farmers a peer support network, advocates for agriculture policy and enables famers to adopt new conservation practices.

== History ==
Practical Farmers of Iowa was founded in 1985, a time when farmers were under great economic pressure. During that time, Iowa agriculture was in a threefold crisis: Evidence of the negative ecological consequences of current farming practices was mounting; the collapse of commodity prices called into question the economic sustainability of agriculture; and the demise of thousands of farms was draining the vitality of rural communities. Amid the turmoil of that time period, farmers sought ways to bring greater diversity to their farms as a means of reducing the need for costly inputs. A group of like-minded farmers came together looking for answers to how to make crop and livestock diversity work for them.

It was during this time that Larry Kallem, a staff member with the Iowa Institute for Cooperatives in Ames, attended a field day at the Boone-area farm of Dick and Sharon Thompson. Impressed by the scientific methods the Thompson used to conduct research trials on their farm – and their sustainable, low-input, practical approach to farming – Larry invited Dick, Sharon and two other speakers to present at an Iowa Institute workshop on low-input farming in the autumn of 1984.

== Board of Directors ==
Practical Farmers of Iowa is governed by a 12-person board of directors. To ensure a focus on members’ priorities, 10 of the 12 board members must be farmers. One farmer director is elected from each of five Iowa districts. Additionally, five farmers and two non-farmers are elected from the membership at-large. Board members serve in many capacities, from ensuring fiscal soundness and effective programs to providing leadership, advice and direction to staff and volunteers.

== Projects ==
Practical Farmers of Iowa works to encourage the adoption of cover crops and other conservation practices, through work with farmers and organizations. In 2018, Practical Farmers of Iowa partnered with Unilever and PepsiCo on a cover crops effort. In 2024, more than 2,300 farmers planted over 800,000 acres of cover crops as part of PFI's cover crop cost-share program. In 2025, PepsiCo and Cargill announced plans to partner with PFI to give technical and financial support to farmers for adopting practices including cover crops, reduced tillage, and reduced nitrogen application.

The organization facilitated 59 field days across Iowa and other states in 2024 where farmers visited other farms and shared best practices.
