= List of soil scientists =

A soil scientist is a contributor to soil science. Soil scientists include agronomists, pedologists and soil classifiers.

The following is a list of notable soil scientists.

Name	Birth/death	Country	Remark
William Albrecht	1888–1974	USA	
Joselito (Lito) M. Arocena	1959–2015	Canada	Founding member of University of Northern British Columbia and became its first Canada Research Chair in 2001
Mary C. Baltz	1923–2011	USA	First woman soil scientist officially assigned in the field for NRCS
Vera A. Baltz	1866–1943	Russia	One of the first female soil scientists in Russia
Percy Edgar Brown	1885–1937	USA	
Johan Bouma	1940–	Netherlands	
John Catt	1939–2017	UK	Paleopedologist
George Nelson Coffey	1875–1967	USA	Pioneer of American soil classification
Enrico Dalgas	1828–1894	Denmark	Pioneer of soil amelioration and naturalist
Charles Darwin	1809–1882	UK	Father of modern soil science. First scholarly treatment of soil forming processes
Johanna Döbereiner	1924–2000	Brazil	Prominent Brazilian agronomist
Vasily V. Dokuchaev	1840–1903	Russia	Variously the father of modern soil science, pedology, soil geography
Friedrich Albert Fallou	1794–1877	Germany	Founder of modern soil science; coined the term "pedology"
W. B. George	1899–1972	Canada	Kemptville Agricultural School lecturer and chairman of the Fertilizer Advisory Board of Ontario
Konstantin Glinka	1867–1927	Russia	Prominent Russian soil scientist
Eugene W. Hilgard	1833–1916	USA	Father of modern soil science in the USA
Francis D. Hole	1913–2002	USA	Pedologist and educator
Aminul Islam	1935–2017	Bangladesh	Soil horizon of Bangladesh land
Hans Jenny	1899–1992	USA	Influential pedologist
Franklin Hiram King	1848–1911	USA	Father of American soil physics
Nikolai Aleksandrovich Krasil'nikov	1896–1973	Russia	Microbiologist
Justus von Liebig	1803–1873	Germany	Father of soil chemistry
Thomas Lyttleton Lyon	1869–1938	USA	
Curtis F. Marbut	1863–1935	USA	Father of American pedology
Alex McBratney		Australia	Prominent Australian soil scientist
Sławomir Miklaszewski	1874–1949	Poland	Founder of the Polish pedologie scientific school
John Mortvedt	1932–2012	USA	Micronutrient fertilizer researcher
Bernard Palissy	~1510–1590	France	First to research amending soil to replenish minerals
Ana Maria Primavesi	1920–2020	Brazil	Prominent Brazilian soil scientist
Bashiru Ademola Raji		Nigeria	
Lorenzo A. Richards	1904–1993	USA	Soil physicist
Pedro A. Sanchez	1940–	USA	World food systems visionary
Olivier de Serres	1529–1619	France	Promoted crop rotation as a way of preserving soil nutrients
Emil Truog	1884–1969	USA	
Guy D. Smith	1907–1981	USA	
Selman Waksman	1888–1973	USA	Soil microbiologist
