= Abdul Rashid (agriculturist) =

Pakistani biologist (born 1950)

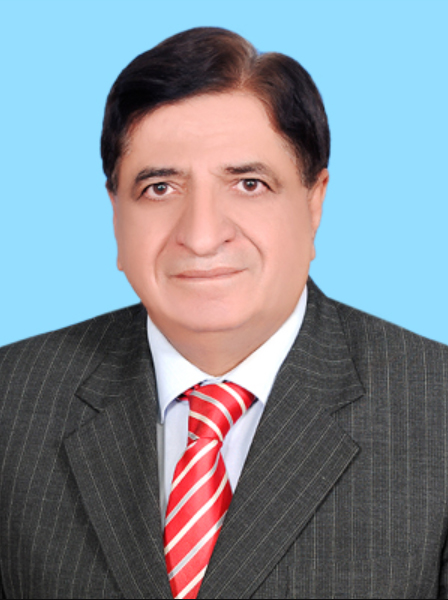
- Born: 1950 (age 75–76)
- Education: University of Hawaii at Manoa, U.S.
- Known for: Soil fertility and plant nutrition with emphasis on Micronutrient Nutrition of Crop Plants
- Awards: IPNI Science Award; IFA Norman Borlaug Award for excellence in crop nutrition research J Benton Jones Award; East–West Center Distinguished Alumni Award; Fellow of Pakistan Academy of Sciences; Fellow of Indian Society of Soil Science; Fellow of Soil Science Society of Pakistan; PARC Silver Jubilee Award
- Scientific career
- Fields: Agricultural sciences, soil science, biosciences
- Institutions: Pakistan Academy of Sciences; Pakistan Atomic Energy Commission; Pakistan Agricultural Research Council Nuclear Institute of Agriculture and Biology (NIAB)
- Thesis: Mapping Zinc Fertility of Soils Using Indicator Plants and Soil Analysis (1986)
- Doctoral advisor: Dr. Robert L. Fox

Abdul Rashid (born 1950) is a Pakistani agricultural scientist, who has served as a Member (Bio-sciences) of the Pakistan Atomic Energy Commission (PAEC) from 2008 to 2011 and Director General of Pakistan's National Agricultural Research Center (NARC) from 2006 to 2008. He received a Ph.D. from the University of Hawaii at Manoa, Hawaii, in the United States.

== Early life and career ==
Abdul Rashid studied mechanisms of zinc deficiency in rice, wheat, and corn from 1973 to 1979. Those studies and establishments led him to a position of collaboration at the Micronutrients Project in Pakistan. Eventually, he obtained BSc (Honors) and MSc (Honors) from the University of Agriculture Faisalabad, Pakistan, and after winning an East-West Center scholarship, he received his PhD in agronomy and soil science from the University of Hawaii at Manoa, Honolulu, in 1986. There he worked on a micronutrient problem, which was of importance to him and his country at the time. After graduation, Abdul Rashid returned to the National Agricultural Research Center in Islamabad and began studying soil fertility and plant nutrition.

In 1970, Abdul Rashid had observed boron fertilization in calcareous soils, but the research and development did not receive enough attention, because at that time, the facilities were inadequate and the scientists lacked expertise in the analysis of boron. Because of it, Abdul Rashid had established plant boron analysis, a tactic of systematic nutrient indexing and diagnosing macro- and micronutrient deficiencies in farmer-grown crops which was studied at various greenhouses.

From the mid-1980s to 2008, Abdul Rashid led an R&D program in soil fertility and plant nutrition at the National Agricultural Research Center, Islamabad. In particular, his research team established that the deficiency of the boron micronutrient in rice crops reduces yield as well as impairs grain quality. He established the incidence of widespread deficiency of boron and zinc micronutrients in cotton crops. His field and laboratory research resulted in the development of cost-effective farmer-friendly technologies of boron fertilizer use in rice, boron and zinc fertilizer use in cotton, use of zinc-enriched rice nursery, and 50% fertilizer saving phosphate band placement technology for wheat.

From 2006 to 2008 he was Director General of the National Agricultural Research Centre.

Since 2008, Abdul Rashid has been a member of the HarvestZinc Project, a multi-national research initiative, under the leadership of Prof. Ismail Cakmak of Sabanci University in Turkey, which has established the farmer-friendly technology of enriching staple cereal grains with zinc, iodine, and selenium using the agronomic biofortification approach. Despite his retirement from formal service in 2011, he is involved in agricultural R&D related activities.

He has published peer reviewed papers, book chapters, encyclopedia chapters, books, technical reports, and advisory materials. Also, his farmer-friendly fertilizer use technologies are formally recommended and widely adapted in Pakistan.

As a member of the Pakistan Atomic Energy Commission, he administered agricultural and biotechnological research and development at four establishments (i.e., NIA, Tandojam; NIAB, Faisalabad; NIFA, Peshawar; and NIBGE, Faisalabad), and managed 18 Nuclear Medicine and Oncology Cancer Hospitals located throughout Pakistan.

Abdul Rashid is on the Editorial Boards of the European Journal of Agronomy (Elsevier) and Communications in Soil Science & Plant Analysis (Taylor & Francis).

== Awards ==
Abdul Rashid is affiliated with the Pakistan Academy of Sciences, Soil Science Society of America, American Society of Agronomy, Indian Society of Soil Science, East–West Center, Association of Former PARC Scientists, and Soil Science Society of Pakistan, of which he is a past President.

Abdul Rashid is the 2013 IFA Norman Borlaug Award recipient for excellence in plant nutrition research; in 2017 he was chosen as an IPNI Science Award winner. The same year, he also became the recipient of the J Benton Jones Award for his contributions in soil testing and plant analysis. He is an East-West Center Distinguished Alumnus; Fellow of the Pakistan Academy of Sciences, Indian Society of Soil Science, and Soil Science Society of Pakistan; PARC Silver Jubilee Laureate, Pakistan's Scientist of the Year, and National Book Foundation Awardee.

In 2005, Abdul Rashid was Pakistan's Dr Norman Borlaug Award recipient.

== Works ==
- 2004 – Challenges and Strategies of Dryland Agriculture
