= Kate Scow =

American soil scientist

Kate Marie Scow is an American soil scientist and microbiologist whose research investigates the soil microbiome especially in contexts of agricultural soil management and the remediation of polluted environments. She is Distinguished Professor Emerita of Soil Science and Microbial Ecology in the Department of Land, Air and Water Resources (LAWR) at the University of California, Davis. She was director of the Russell Ranch Sustainable Agriculture Facility and director of the University of California's Kearney Foundation of Soil Science. Scow was a former editor-in-chief of Soil Biology and Biochemistry.

== Education and career ==
Scow is originally from Rockville, Maryland and lived, as a child, in Argentina and Israel. Her first experience with soil was on a road trip across Europe with her family, collecting soil from every country she passed through. She majored in biology at Antioch College, graduating in 1973. After graduate studies at Harvard University and in evolutionary biology at University of Chicago, she earned a master's degree and Ph.D. in soil science from Cornell University in 1986 and 1989 respectively. She joined the Dept of Land, Air and Water Resources as assistant professor at the University of California, Davis in 1989 and retired in 2021. She was visiting professor in agroecology at Maringa State University in Parana, Brazil.

== Recognition ==
Scow was elected as a Fellow of the Soil Science Society of America in 2000. She was the 2017 Nyle Brady Frontiers in Soil Science lecturer at the meeting of the American Society of Agronomy, Crop Science Society of America, and Soil Science Society of America, and the 2019 Francis E. Clark Distinguished Lecturer on Soil Biology. In 2022 she was elected to both the National Academy of Sciences and National Academy of Engineering.
