= Arocena =

Arocena is a surname. Notable people with the surname include:

- Stephanie Arocena (born 1988), NY Born Fine Jeweler
- Daymé Arocena (born 1992), Afro-Cuban jazz singer
- Horacio Terra Arocena (1894–1985), Uruguayan architect and politician
- Joselito (Lito) M. Arocena (1959–2015) - Filipino-Canadian soil scientist
- Rodrigo Arocena (born 1947), Uruguayan mathematician and academic administrator
