= Betty Klepper =

American scientist

- Born: 8 March 1936; Memphis, Tennessee
- Died: 26 October 2018 (aged 82); Pendleton, Oregon
- Resting place: Pendleton Pioneer Chapel
- Education: Vanderbilt University; University of Exeter on a Marshall Scholarship; Duke University
- Known for: Editor of Crop Science. First women Fellow of the Soil Science Society of America and first women President of the Crop Science Society of America.
- Scientific career
- Workplaces: United States Department of Agriculture; Pacific Northwest National Laboratory; Commonwealth Scientific and Industrial Research Organisation; Auburn University; Agricultural Research Service

Elizabeth Lee "Betty" Klepper (1936 – 2018) was an American agronomic scientist from Memphis, Tennessee.

== Life ==
In 1954 Klepper began her university education at Vanderbilt University. Throughout her undergraduate years, she drifted from maths to chemistry and physics, and finally to biology in her junior year. Following this, she went to the United Kingdom on a Marshall Scholarship, where she studied botany and associated subjects at University of Exeter. She returned to a teaching position at Hutchinson School in Memphis. She soon went to Duke University to continue with her post-graduate and doctoral education, and followed this up with post-doctoral research in Australia after which she returned to the United States. While teaching agronomy at Auburn University, she was hired by the United States Department of Agriculture Rhizotron Laboratory. She continued her research work alongside Dr. Howard Taylor of the United States Department of Agriculture-Agricultural Research Service group until 1976, at which time she relocated to the Columbia Plateau Conservation Research Center in Pendleton, Oregon, where she focused her efforts on the use of innovative interdisciplinary research to improve the production and growth of wheat. In 1985, Klepper was the first woman to be elected a fellow of the Soil Science Society of America, and in 1985 she also elected a member of the American Society of Agronomy. She remained a member of the American Society of Agronomy–Crop Science Society of America–Soil Science Society of America throughout the remainder of her career. Following retirement, environmental education and stewardship kept her busy.
