= Richmond Jay Bartlett =

American soil scientist (1927–2005)

Bartlett in his laboratory at the University of Vermont

Richmond Jay Bartlett (September 23, 1927 – December 20, 2005) was an American soil scientist and professor. He received his BS degree (Biology) in 1949 and his PhD in 1958 (Soil Chemistry), both from the Ohio State University, in Columbus. He spent the next 40 years at the University of Vermont in Burlington. Upon his retirement in 1997 he was named professor emeritus, a rank he retained until his death in 2005. Bartlett was known for his creative approach to the study of soils and how they function in ecological systems, especially at the molecular and colloidal levels. He was able to apply scientific concepts to farming and ecology in ways that allowed the practical and theoretical to inform each other. The focus of his research with his graduate students was on oxidation-reduction chemistry, soil acidity, and soil testing. He became known for this thoughtful summary of the nature of soils:

SOIL, perfect home for the actual and figurative roots of all life, including green plants, source of oxygen and food; synthesizer of itself, buffer of pH, pe, and temperature; supplier and recycler of water and carbon, manganese and iron, and all life-essential chemical elements; scavenger of free radicals, toxicity, and disease, cleanser of ecosystems; and lastly, essence of beauty and comfort from Mother Earth. Walk lightly.

== Life ==
=== Early life and education ===
Richmond Bartlett was born in 1927 in Columbus, Ohio. His mother, Cecil Richmond Bartlett was a writer and journalist; his father, Claude Jay Bartlett, was a lawyer. Upon the death of his father at age 50 in 1941, when Rich was 14 and his brother, Jack, was 10, their widowed mother moved the family out of the city to a farm she and Claude had purchased as an investment. They raised cows, pigs, and a variety of crops. He interrupted his university education toward the end of World War II to volunteer for the Army. He spent a year in Japan in the Army of Occupation as a surgical technician and medic.

With his tour of duty in Japan and his university degree completed, he spent several years as a newspaper reporter and technical writer. In 1952 he married Martha Harry of Fort Wayne, Indiana. Bartlett returned to Ohio State to begin his studies in soil chemistry with Professor E.O. McLean. His graduate education with McLean introduced him to emerging ideas surrounding soil pH, acidity, and aluminum in soils as they influence plant growth, and these concepts shaped his later research on soil testing, oxidation-reduction processes, and how soil chemistry is linked to natural waters, agriculture, and environmental quality.

=== Professional life ===
Upon the completion of his PhD in 1958, Bartlett became an assistant professor in the Department of Agronomy (later Plant and Soil Science) at the University of Vermont. He was promoted to full professor in 1967. His research was in the laboratory and the field, working with his graduate students. During his four-decade career at the University of Vermont, he received numerous awards, including Fellow of three prestigious professional societies: the American Society of Agronomy, the Soil Science Society of America, and the American Association for the Advancement of Science. He was named University Scholar by the University of Vermont in 1983–84, an honor bestowed on only a few distinguished professors.

He carried on with research and writing in his post-retirement years, often synthesizing and refining concepts related to his earlier discoveries in soil chemistry. He died after a long illness in 2005. Following his death, a memorial bench was placed on the University of Vermont campus with a quote from Walt Whitman's Song of Myself.

I bequeathe myself to the dirt, to grow from the grass I love; If you want me again, look for me under your boot-soles.

== Research ==
Bartlett is best known for research and publications on manganese (Mn), chromium (Cr), and fundamental oxidation-reduction (redox) chemistry in soils. He was also responsible for the refined character of the Vermont Soil Test using measures of exchangeable aluminum (Al) to predict amounts of lime needed to raise soil pH to desired levels for crop production. This modification of the Vermont Soil Test exemplifies how Bartlett used fundamental soil chemical knowledge of Al and soil pH in a practical application to agriculture.

One of his aphorisms was “We all should fall upon our knees and sing out praise for manganese.” His passion for Mn developed from research with his graduate students that showed its redox reactions were cycles. and that a Mn cycle could oxidize, non-toxic, relatively insoluble Cr(III) to the toxic, soluble Cr(VI). Coupled to the Cr(III) oxidation reaction by Mn(III,IV) (hydr)oxides is the reduction of Cr(VI) to Cr(III) by electron-rich forms of organic matter, iron [Fe(II)], and sulfur (e.g., sulfide, H_{2}S). Bartlett's new thinking and research results on the soil chemistry of Mn significantly refined our understanding of the thermodynamics and reactions of this metal, and his ideas were cited and widely influential in diverse fields of environmental geochemistry, clay mineralogy, soil and water chemistry, and environmental science.

In the late 1970s while investigating the redox reactions of Cr in soils, Bartlett and his students discovered that this Mn cycle and its links to the Cr cycle were much more active in field-moist soils than in the air-dried, stored soil materials that were routinely studied in soil chemistry laboratories around the world. When he and Bruce James submitted their findings on the redox implications of air-drying soils—dubbed the “soil-dirt hypothesis” to distinguish field-moist from air-dry material used in laboratory research—they received intensely negative reviews. The published paper led to more attention being paid to the myriad soil chemical changes that result from air-drying and rewetting soils in the field and for laboratory research. These publications on air-drying soils and those on electron transfer reactions illustrate how Bartlett as a quiet scientist working in the field and his laboratory had significant effects on future research by in soil chemistry and related fields based on oxidation-reduction processes in soils and natural waters.
