= Journal of Environmental Quality =

- Discipline: Environmental science
- Language: English
- Edited by: Jean McLain

Publication details
- History: 1972-present
- Publisher: American Society of Agronomy; Crop Science Society of America; Soil Science Society of America (United States)
- Frequency: Continuous
- Open access: Hybrid
- Impact factor: 2.3 (2024)

Standard abbreviations
- ISO 4: J. Environ. Qual.

Indexing
- ISSN: 0047-2425 (print); 1537-2537 (web)
- OCLC no.: 1800003

Links
- Journal homepage; Online Archive

The Journal of Environmental Quality is a bimonthly peer-reviewed scientific journal publishing original research in the area of anthropogenic impacts on the environment, including terrestrial, atmospheric and aquatic systems. According to Journal Citation Reports, the journal has a 2024 impact factor of 2.3. It was established in 1972 as the first joint publication of the not-for-profit American Society of Agronomy, Crop Science Society of America, and Soil Science Society of America. The journal is currently published by the three societies in partnership with Wiley. The journal was a quarterly publication for the period of 1972 to 1993. Since 1994 it has been a bimonthly publication journal. Since 2013, it is available online only. The journals is currently continuously published online.
