= Glenn W. Burton =

American agricultural scientist (1910–2005)

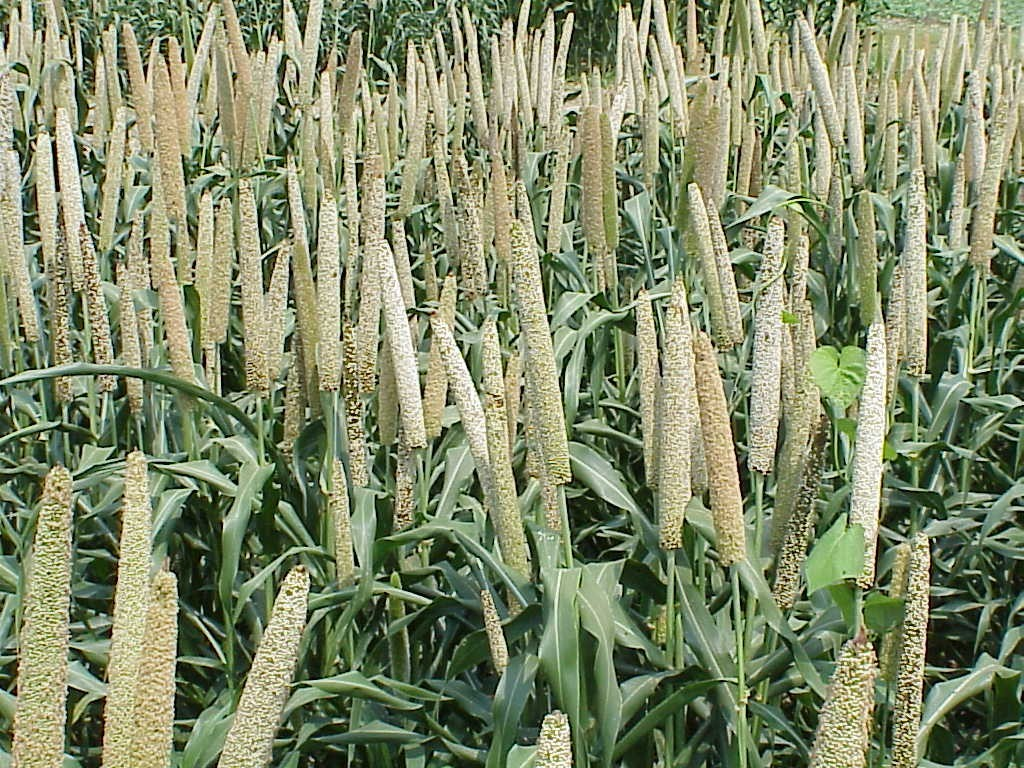
- Pearl millet, Tifton
- Born: May 5, 1910; Clatonia, Gage County, Nebraska
- Died: November 22, 2005 (aged 95); Tifton, Georgia
- Education: University of Nebraska; Rutgers University
- Awards: President's Award for Distinguished Federal Civilian Service (1981)
- Scientific career
- Fields: Agricultural scientist

Family: Joe Burton (son)

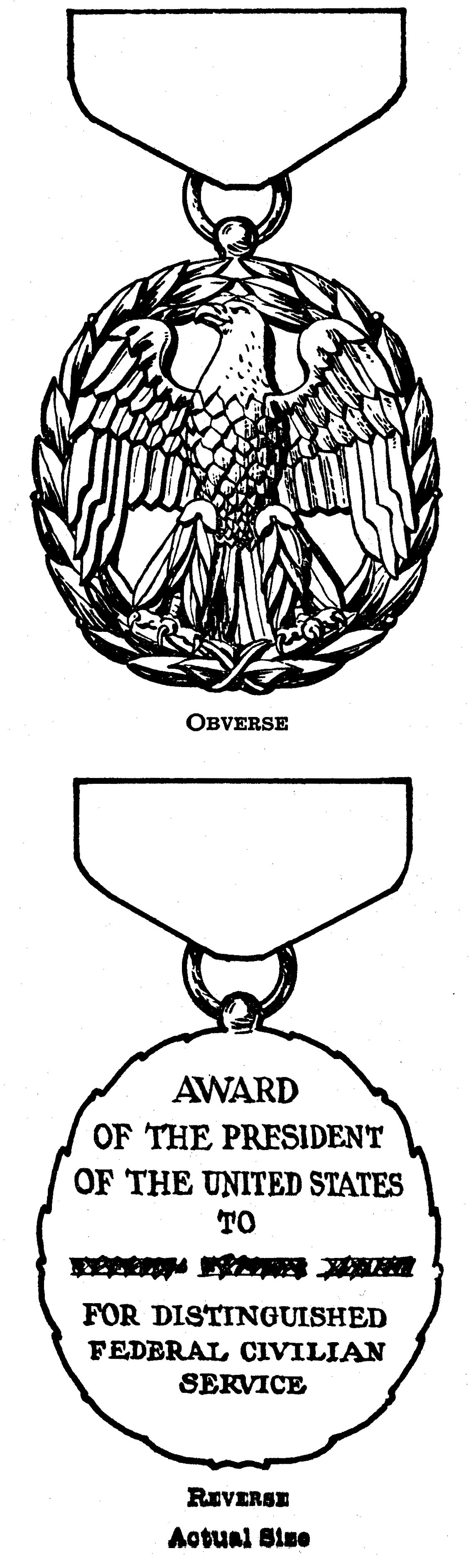
Award design, from Executive Order

Glenn W. Burton (May 5, 1910 near Clatonia, Gage County, Nebraska – November 22, 2005 Tifton, Georgia) was an American agricultural scientist notable for his pioneering work in plant breeding, development of pearl millet in 1956, and for other contributions that helped increase world food production.

Burton was also known for the development of Bermuda grasses used on athletic fields. His Tifton 419 was the most widely used Bermuda grass worldwide as of 2006.

Burton received the National Medal of Science from President Ronald Reagan: "For outstanding contributions to the biological sciences that have helped to feed the hungry, protect and beautify the environment, and provide recreation for millions."

Burton was a member of the National Academy of Sciences and chair of the Agronomic Science Foundation.

== Education ==
Burton received his bachelor's degree from the University of Nebraska in 1932. He received his master's degree in 1933 and Ph.D. in 1936 from Rutgers University.

== Awards ==
His notable awards, honors and distinctions included:

- 1949 - American Society of Agronomy Stevenson Award
- 1949 - Fellow, American Society of Agronomy
- 1955 - Honorary D.Sc. degree from Rutgers University
- 1962 - Honorary D.Sc. degree from University of Nebraska
- 1968 - Agricultural Institute of Canada Recognition Award
- 1973 - DuPont Foundation Medal for Distinguished Service to Man
- 1975 - Elected to the National Academy of Sciences
- 1979 - DeKalb Crop Science Distinguished Career Award
- 1980 - USDA Distinguished Service Award
- 1980 - Southern Turfgrass Association Honorary Member Award
- 1981 - President's Award for Distinguished Federal Civilian Service
- 1982 - University of Nebraska–Lincoln Alumni Achievement Award
- 1982 - University of Nebraska–Lincoln Master Alumni Award
- 1982 - National Medal of Science, presented by President Reagan
- 1984 - Elected into University of Georgia Agricultural Alumni Hall of Fame
- 1985 - Fellow, Crop Science Society of America
- 1988 - The Alexander von Humboldt Foundation Award
- 1988 - Honorary membership in the Grassland Society of Southern Africa
- 1994 - Inducted into Georgia Turfgrass Hall of Fame
- 1995 - Inducted into Georgia Golf Hall of Fame
- 1997 - Inducted into Georgia Cattlemen's Hall of Fame
- 1997 - Crop Science Society of America Presidential Award
