= Alfred J. Turgeon =

American agronomist

- Born: September 13, 1943 (age 82); White Plains, New York, U.S.
- Education: Rutgers University (B.S.) Michigan State University (M.S., Ph.D.)
- Known for: Turfgrass Management (textbook), turfgrass education
- Spouse: Jean Krinbill Turgeon
- Awards: Fred U. Grau Turfgrass Science Award Distinguished Service Award (GCSAA)
- Scientific career
- Fields: Agronomy, Turfgrass science
- Workplaces: Pennsylvania State University

Alfred J. Turgeon (born September 13, 1943) is an American agronomist, educator, author, and former military officer known for his work in the field of turfgrass science and education. He is best known for his widely used textbook Turfgrass Management, his innovations in distance learning, and his decades-long academic leadership at several major universities. Turgeon is Professor Emeritus of Turfgrass Management at Pennsylvania State University.

== Early life and education ==
Turgeon was born in White Plains, New York. As a teenager, he was introduced to golf course management by his uncle, Bruno Vadala, and worked for seven summers at the Metropolis Country Club, performing turf maintenance tasks.

He earned a B.S. in Plant Science from Rutgers University in 1965. Following graduation, he served in the U.S. Army during the Vietnam War, completing infantry and helicopter pilot training and serving a combat tour in Vietnam from 1966 to 1967. His military decorations include the Distinguished Flying Cross, Bronze Star Medal, the Air Medal with 16 oak leaf clusters, the Army Commendation Medal with “V” device, and the Purple Heart.

Turgeon's military service introduced him to teaching, particularly during his final year when he served as a meteorology instructor at Fort Wolters, Texas. After leaving the military, he pursued graduate studies at Michigan State University, earning an M.S. in Crop Science in 1970 and a Ph.D. in 1971. His doctoral research focused on turfgrass weed control and herbicide action and metabolism.

== Academic and professional career ==
In 1971, Turgeon joined the University of Illinois at Urbana-Champaign as an assistant professor of turfgrass management. He was promoted to associate professor in 1976.

From 1980 to 1983, Turgeon served as the professor and resident director of research at the Texas A&M Research and Extension Center in Dallas. In this role, he managed agricultural research operations and secured funding to modernize laboratory and field facilities. His responsibilities included managing research programs in turfgrass breeding, pathology, and entomology, along with work in forage and small-grains breeding, cotton entomology, and ornamental horticulture.

In 1983, Turgeon joined TruGreen Corporation in East Lansing, Michigan, as vice president for research and technical services.

He returned to academia in 1986, joining Pennsylvania State University as professor and head of the Department of Agronomy. He served in this administrative capacity until 1994, then continued as professor of turfgrass management until his retirement in 2011.

== Contributions ==
Turgeon's research has encompassed various aspects of turfgrass science, including morphogenesis, edaphology, weed management, and sustainable turf systems. He has authored or co-authored over 300 scholarly publications in these areas.

Among his most influential works is the textbook Turfgrass Management, first published in 1980. The book has undergone multiple revisions and is widely regarded as a foundational resource for students and professionals in turfgrass science.

Turgeon integrated computer-based and web-based instruction into turfgrass education. He developed asynchronous, case-based, and modular learning systems to accommodate a diverse student population, including working professionals and international students. His instructional methods have been referenced in discussions on distance learning in agricultural sciences.

== Awards and recognition ==
In 2006, the Turfgrass Management Division of the Crop Science Society of America named him one of the ten most influential individuals in turfgrass science in the preceding 50 years. Other recognitions include:

- Fred U. Grau Turfgrass Science Award by the Crop Science Society of America (2002)
- Dubin Pioneer Award in Outreach and Online Education (Penn State, 2014)
- Distinguished Service Award, Golf Course Superintendents Association of America (2016)

== Selected publications ==
- Turgeon, A. J. (2012). Turfgrass Management (9th ed.). Pearson Prentice Hall.
- Turgeon, A. J., McCarty, L. B., & Christians, N. (2008). Weed Control in Turf and Ornamentals. Pearson.
- Turgeon, A. J. & Vargas, J. M. Jr. (2005). The Turf Problem Solver. Wiley.
- Vargas, J. M. & Turgeon, A. J., (2004). Poa Annua: Physiology, Culture, and Control of Annual Bluegrass. Wiley.
- Choi, I., Land, S. M., & Turgeon, A. J. (2008). "Instructor Modeling and Online Question Prompts." Journal of Educational Technology Systems, 36: 255–275.
- Turgeon, A. J. (2008). "Developing Online Instructional Modules." ACTA Horticulturae, 783: 583–588.
- Dai, J. & Turgeon, A. J. (2008). "Loop-Embedded Turfgrass Modules." Journal of Natural Resources and Life Sciences Education, 37: 63–68.

== Personal life ==
Turgeon is married to Jean Krinbill Turgeon of Missouri. They have two daughters and live in Charlotte, North Carolina.
