= Döbereiner =

Döbereiner is a surname. Notable people with the surname include:

- Johann Wolfgang Döbereiner (1780–1849), German chemist
- Johanna Döbereiner (1924–2000), Brazilian agronomist
