= Hui-Hai Liu =

Hui-Hai Liu (Chinese: 刘会海) is a reservoir engineer and hydrogeologist. He specializes in fracture reservoir, coupled hydrological and mechanical processes, physics and properties of subsurface multiphase flow and transport, and their applications in reservoir engineering and nuclear waste management.

== Biography ==
He received a 1983 B.S. in hydraulic machinery from Beijing Agricultural Engineering University, China, and a 1986 MS in fluid engineering from Huazhong University of Science and Technology, China, with a thesis "An improved singularity method to describe water flow in hydraulic turbines." He then received a Ph.D. in the United States, with a degree in soil physics from Auburn University in 1995 for a thesis "An experimental and numerical study on fingering flow and mixing of variable density contaminants in porous media".

He served as an assistant professor in the Department of Environmental System Engineering, Clemson University from 1995 to 1997 and came to California in 1997 as research scientist at Lawrence Berkeley National Laboratory (LBNL). He had served as head of the Hydrogeology and Reservoir Dynamics Department at LBNL from 2009 to 2012. Since 2014, he has been with Aramco Research Center.

== Research ==
He has one research monograph and more than 100 peer-reviewed articles/book chapters published, and made several major original contributions in his areas, including the development of (1) the active fracture model (AFM) that has been used as the base-case theory of flow and transport in unsaturated fractured rock by the Yucca Mountain nuclear waste repository Project, (2) the two-part Hooke's model (TPHM) by generalizing Hooke's law to incorporate mechanical heterogeneity of natural rocks, and (3) a new theory for fingering flow of water in the vadose zone based on the optimality principle that fingering flow in the subsurface is self-organized in such a way that total flow resistance is minimal.

== Honors ==
He became a fellow of the Geological Society of America in 2007 and a distinguished member of Society of Petroleum Engineers in 2017. He is also a recipient of Emil Truog soil science award from Soil Science Society of America and a Director's award for exceptional achievement from Lawrence Berkeley National Laboratory.
