= Rafiq Ahmad (beekeeper) =

Pakistani scientist

Rafiq Ahmad was an Agriculture Scientist and the founder of modern beekeeping in Asia.

== Career ==
Ahmad worked as an entomologist at the Commonwealth Institute of Biological control, South American Station, Argentina and Pakistan station Rawalpindi. He was the chief scientific Officer at the National Honeybee Research Institute, the National Co-ordinator, and deputy director of the General National Agriculture Research Center in Islamabad, Pakistan (PARC).

In 1977 Rafiq Ahmad was assigned by the government of Pakistan to establish a honeybee culture program in the country. Multiple attempts by the department at Faisalabad University to establish European honeybees in the area, beginning in 1928, had failed.

Rafiq Ahmad established HBRI (Honey Beekeeping Research Institute) at NARC (National Agricultural Research Centre) in Islamabad, Pakistan. He discovered through research there that inbreeding was the major reason for the death of European bees in Asia, and resolved this issue. In the early 1980s Pakistan became first autonomous Asian country in honey production and export.

Ahmad also conducted research on the effectiveness of honey bees as fruit pollinators.

In 1992 he retired from Pakistan Government institute NARC. After retirement, he founded the National Beekeeping Federation, consisting of 52 Pakistani Beekeepers who harvest export class honey.

== Awards ==
For his research, work and writings in the field of beekeeping, Ahmad has received a number of prizes and medals, including a Gold Medal and a Silver Jubilee medal from the government of Pakistan.
