= Winter wheat =

Strain of wheat grown over the winter, rather than the summer

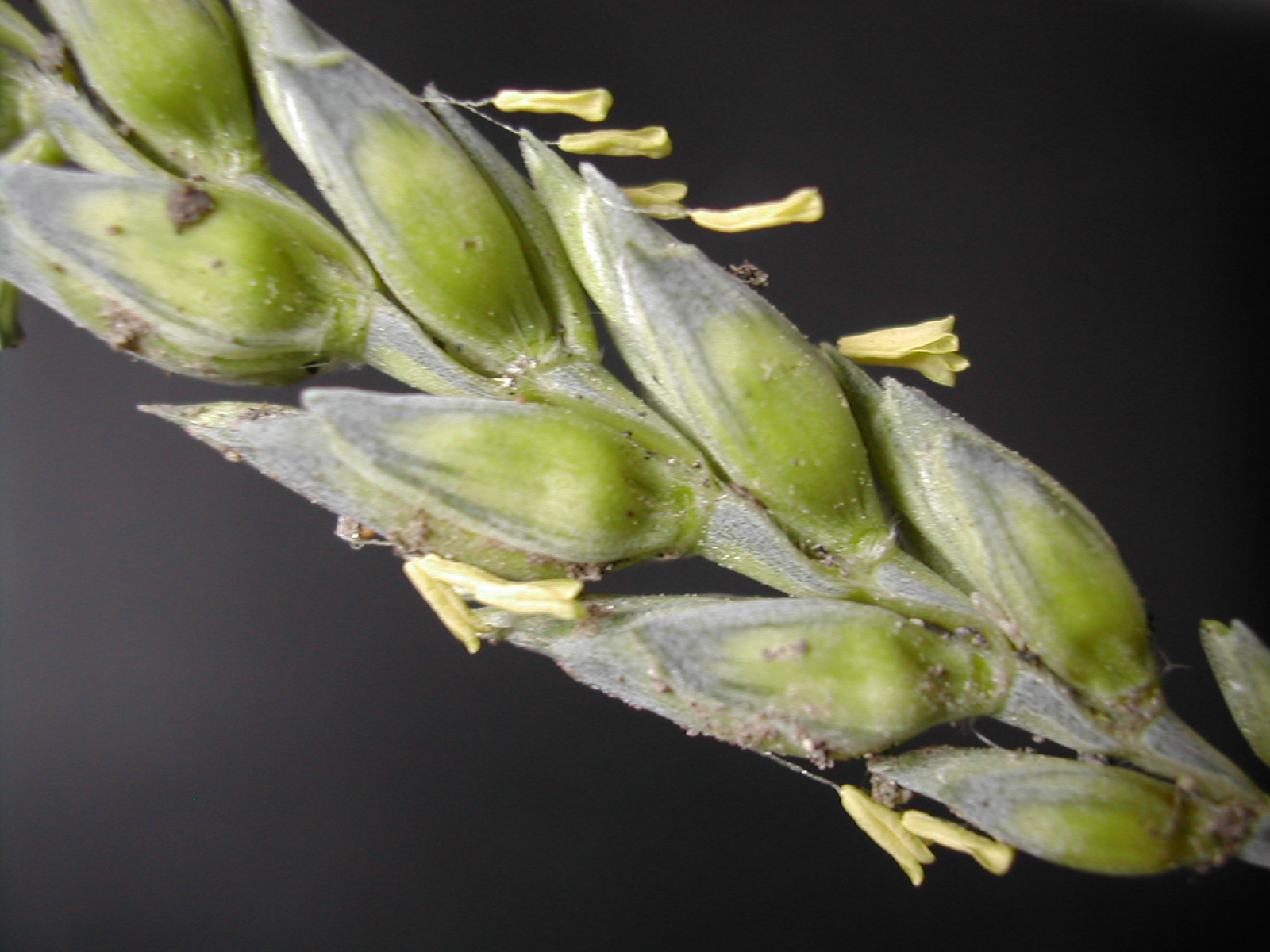
An ear of winter wheat

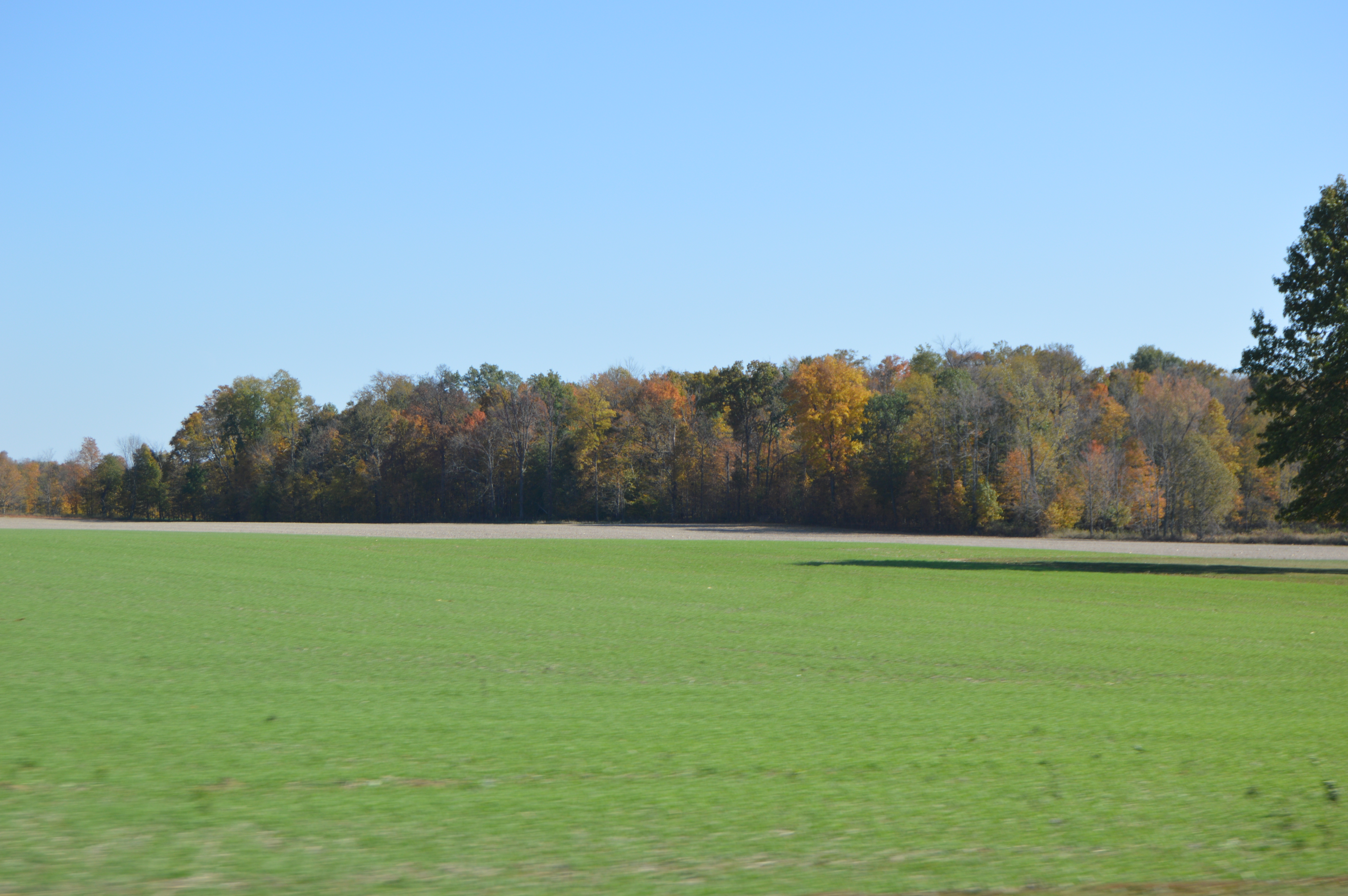
Winter wheat with autumn colors in the eastern United States

Winter wheat (usually Triticum aestivum) are strains of wheat that are planted in the autumn to germinate and develop into young plants that remain in the vegetative phase during the winter and resume growth in early spring. Classification into spring wheat versus winter wheat is common and traditionally refers to the season during which the crop is grown. For winter wheat, the physiological stage of heading (when the ear first emerges) is delayed until the plant experiences vernalization, a period of 30 to 60 days of cold winter temperatures (0 to 5 °C; 32 to 41 °F).

Winter wheat is usually planted from September to November (in the Northern Hemisphere) and harvested in the summer or early autumn of the next year. Winter wheat usually yields more than spring wheat.

So-called "facultative" wheat varieties need shorter periods of vernalization time (15–30 days) and temperatures of 3 to 15 °C (37 to 59 °F). In many areas, facultative varieties can be grown either as winter or as a spring wheat, depending on time of sowing.

In countries that experience mild winters, such as in South Asia (India, Pakistan, Nepal, Bangladesh), North Africa, the Middle East, and the lower latitudes (e.g. Sonora in Mexico), spring wheat (not requiring a period of vernalization) is also sown in the autumn (November–December) and harvested in late spring (April–May) the next year. This spring wheat planted in the autumn and grown over the winter is sometimes also incorrectly called "winter wheat", and is also known as a rabi crop.

Hard winter wheats have a higher gluten protein content than other wheats. They are used to make flour for yeast breads, or are blended with soft spring wheats to make the all-purpose flour used in a wide variety of baked products. Pure soft wheat is used for specialty or cake flour. Durum, the hardest wheat, is primarily used for making pasta. Almost all durum wheat grown in North America is spring-planted.

Winter wheat is grown throughout Eurasia and North America.

== Cultivation ==
Winter wheat is grown as a cash crop and a forage crop. Optimal growing conditions for winter wheat include high-drainage soil with medium texture. Mid-quality soil nutrient content is best for winter wheat, with an appropriate supply of nitrogen being critical for the wheat to be able to establish itself in time before winter dormancy. In addition, a firm seedbed helps protect the wheat over the winter. In the United States, about 40% of the total wheat production is of a strain known as hard red winter wheat, with soft red winter wheat contributing another 15% of the annual wheat crop. Also, winter varieties of white wheat are grown. Soft red winter wheat is also grown in the Canadian province of Ontario, along with white winter wheat.

== Benefits of growing winter wheat ==
- If used as cover crop, winter wheat helps maintain topsoil, preventing soil erosion over winter when many fields lie fallow.
- Winter wheat outcompetes many weed varieties.
- It can be grown as both cover crop and cash crop.
- Easy to manage, it still provides a good yield.
- It helps build soil (through heavy production of organic material) and cycle nutrients through soil.
- This wheat uses soil moisture more efficiently, since it starts to grow earlier in the spring.
- Winter wheat crops are harvested earlier in the season, which is beneficial in regions with rainy autumn weather.

== United States ==
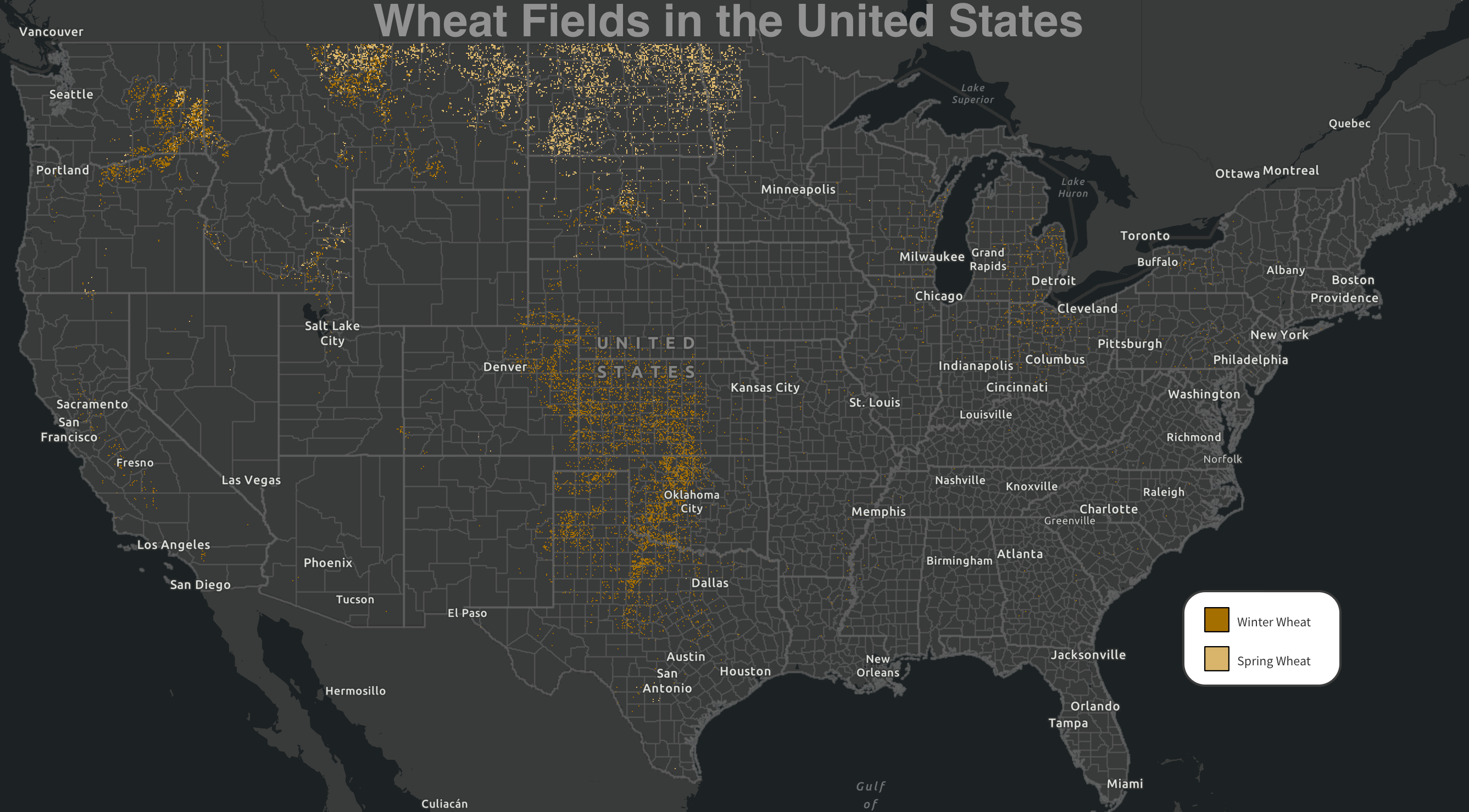
Wheat fields in the United States Winter wheat Spring wheat

Winter wheat was brought to Kansas by German-Russian Mennonites in the 19th century. Bernhard Warkentin and Mark A. Carleton played a major part in the spread of winter wheat as a commercial crop. Warkentin organized mills in central Kansas and imported seed from Ukraine to meet growing demand. Carleton worked for the United States Department of Agriculture as a crop explorer. He went to Russia to find other wheat varieties and worked with Kansas State University researchers to develop new ones. Winter wheat production quickly spread throughout the Great Plains, and was, as it still is, usually grown using the techniques of dryland farming.

== Effects of climate change ==
For temperate climate zones such as Canada, increases in yields for winter wheat due to climate change are predicted. For Ukraine, where temperatures are increasing throughout the year and precipitation is predicted to increase, winter wheat yields could increase by 20–40% in the north and northwestern regions between 2010 and 2050.

== Regional variations ==
Winter wheat cultivation practices vary significantly by region, primarily due to differences in climate and pest pressures. For example, in the North American Great Plains, a primary concern is the plants' ability to survive harsh winters, leading to the selection of cold-hardy varieties of hard red winter wheat.

In contrast, in regions with mild winters (such as USDA hardiness zones 8 and 9), the primary concerns are different. Cultivation in these areas is adapted to address a shorter vernalization period, heat stress, and a higher risk of pests and diseases. In these climates, growers often prefer soft red winter wheat varieties.
