= Mary K. Firestone =

Soil microbiologist

- Born: Oklahoma City, Oklahoma, U.S.
- Education: Michigan State University (Ph.D)
- Awards: Fellow of the Ecological Society of America (2015); Fellow of the American Academy of Microbiology (2002)
- Scientific career
- Workplaces: University of California, Berkeley

Signature
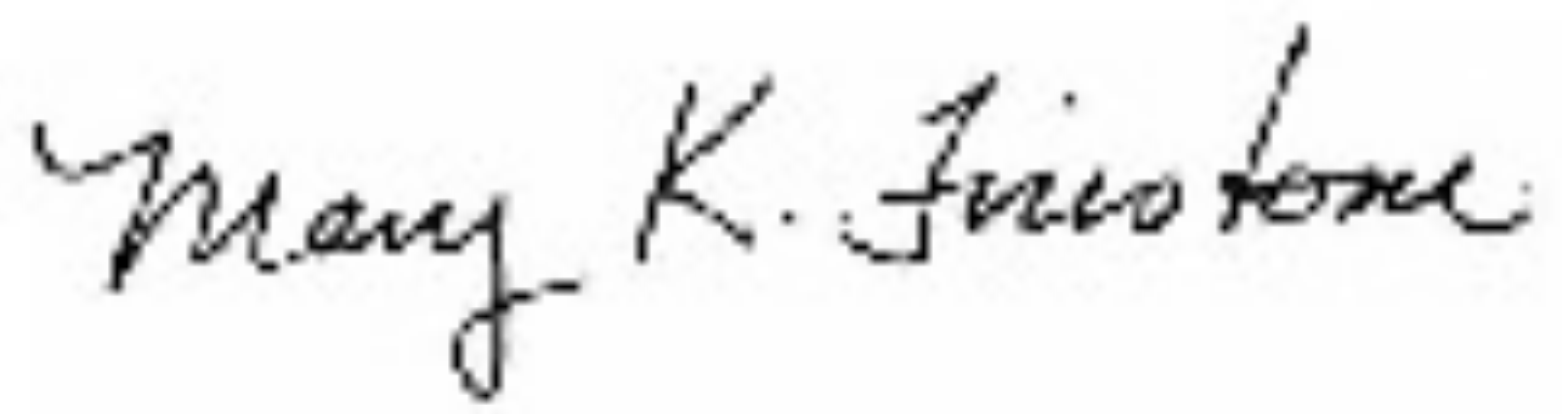

Mary K. Firestone is a professor of soil microbiology in the Department of Environmental Studies, Policy, and Management at the University of California, Berkeley and a member of the National Academy of Sciences. Her laboratory's research focuses on the ecology of microbes in various soils, and their contribution to the carbon cycle and nitrogen cycle in particular.

== Education and career ==
Firestone received her M.Sc. in microbiology in 1977 and her Ph.D. in soil microbiology at Michigan State University in 1979.

Firestone became a Fellow of the Soil Science Society of America in 1995. Since then, she has received numerous honors and awards throughout her career, including the Emil Truog Soil Science Award, and most recently, the Berkeley College of Natural Resources Career Achievement Award in 2013. In addition to these awards, she was named Fellow of the American Academy of Microbiology in 2002, and a member of the U.S. National Academy of Sciences in 2017. She is also a fellow of the Soil Science Society of America, the Ecological Society of America, and the American Geophysical Union.

Firestone has published over 100 peer-reviewed articles and book chapters which have been cited over 9,000 times.

== Research focus ==
Firestone's lab's interests include studying how carbon and nitrogen are processed in soil ecosystems. In particular, her lab is interested in understanding carbon and nitrogen interactions between roots and soil microbes. She is also interested in understanding how the structure of soil microbial communities controls nitrogen and carbon transformations such as nitrification, denitrification, and mineralization

She is also interested in understanding the biophysical properties and mechanisms of bacteria and plant interactions in soil environments and examining how the physical characteristics of soil matrices affect the growth and activity of soil microbes

== Selected publications ==
Brodie EL, DeSantis TZ, Joyner DC, Baek SM, Larsen JT, Adersen GL, Hazen TC, Richardson PM, Herman DJ, Tokunaga TK, Wan JM, Firestone MK (2006). Application of a high-density oligonucleotide microarray approach to study bacterial population dynamics during uranium reduction and reoxidation. Applied and Environmental Microbiology. 72(9):6288-6298.

Waldrop MP, Balser TC, Firestone MK (2000). Linking microbial community composition to function in a tropical soil. Soil Biology and Biochemistry. 32(13):1837-1846.

Stark JM, Firestone MK (1995). Mechanisms for soil moisture effects on activity of nitrifying bacteria. Applied and Environmental Microbiology. 61(1):218-221.

Davidson EA, Hart SC, Firestone MK (1992). Internal cycling of nitrate in soils of a mature coniferous forest. Ecology. 73(4):1148-1156.

Davidson EA, Hart SC, Shanks CA, Firestone MK (1991). Measuring gross nitrogen mineralization, and nitrification by ^{15}N isotopic pool dilution in intact soil cores. Journal of Soil Science. 42(3):335-349.

Kieft TL, Soroker E, Firestone MK (1987). Microbial biomass response to a rapid increase in water potential when dry soil is wetted. Soil Biology and Biochemistry. 19(2):119-126.

Firestone MK, Firestone RB, Tiedje JM (1980). Nitrous oxide from soil denitrification: factors controlling its biological production. Science. 208(4445):749-751.
