= Rajiv Khosla =

Indian-American scientist and professor of precision agriculture

Rajiv Khosla (born 1971) is an Indian-American Scientist and Professor of precision agriculture. He is best known for his work on measurement and management of in-field soil and crop spatial variability for nutrients.

== Biography ==
Khosla received his B.Sc. in agriculture sciences from the University of Allahabad India in 1992. He received his M.S. in soil physics and his Ph.D. from Virginia Tech in 1992 and 1995, respectively. From 1999 till 2020, he served on the faculty of Colorado State University where he held the Monfort Professorship from 2008-2010. Thereafter, he is serving at Kansas State University in the department of Agronomy as head (Professor) since January 2021.

Khosla is an Honorary Lifetime Fellow of International Society of Precision Agriculture, a selected Jefferson Science Fellow, and a Fellow of the Soil and Water Conservation Society, the American Society of Agronomy, and the Soil Science Society of America. In 2012, he served as Jefferson Science Fellow in the Bureau of East Asia Pacific Affairs at the United States Department of State. In 2015, he was named the Precision Agriculture Educator of the Year.
