= Vadose Zone Journal =

- Discipline: Environmental Sciences
- Language: English
- Edited by: Venkat Lakshmi

Publication details
- History: 2002–present
- Publisher: John Wiley & Sons on behalf of the Soil Science Society of America (United States)
- Frequency: Continuous
- Open access: Yes
- Impact factor: 3.5 (2025)

Standard abbreviations
- ISO 4: Vadose Zone J.

Indexing
- CODEN: VZJAAB
- ISSN: 1539-1663
- OCLC no.: 49304217

Links
- Journal homepage; Online access; Online archive

The Vadose Zone Journal is a peer-reviewed scientific journal established in 2002 and published by John Wiley & Sons on behalf of the Soil Science Society of America. It covers research on the vadose zone from across a wide range of disciplines. Since 2018, the journal is published open access.

== Abstracting and indexing ==
The journal is abstracted and indexed in:

- AGRICOLA
- Chemical Abstracts Service
- Current Contents/Soil Science, Water Resources, & Environmental Science
- GeoRef
- Science Citation Index Expanded
- Scopus

According to the Journal Citation Reports, the journal has a 2024 impact factor of 2.8.
