= Alex McBratney =

Australian soil scientist

Professor Alex McBratney AM FRS FAA is an Australian soil scientist.

He was elected Fellow of the Royal Society in 2026

== Early life and education ==
McBratney grew up in Scotland at Whithorn in Dumfries and Galloway.

He has BSc, PhD and DSc degrees from the University of Aberdeen and a DScAgr in precision agriculture from the University of Sydney.

== Career and research ==
After completing his PhD work at Rothamsted Experimental Station in the United Kingdom, McBratney moved to Australia in 1981 and spent seven years with the CSIRO Division of Soils in Brisbane before joining the University of Sydney in 1989.

In 2026 McBratney co-authored a paper “Enhancing soil science research with multi-agent artificial intelligence systems” on the potential of recent technologies (multi-agent artificial intelligence and digital twins) in soil science.

== Awards and Honours ==
include

2016 Fellow of the Australian Academy of Science (FAA)

“A world-leading soil scientist who conceived and developed pedometrics, digital soil mapping and soil security, radically strengthening the knowledge base of soil science. He established new theory and empirical models of soil variation in landscapes and developed their applications, for example, in precision agriculture. His contributions have revolutionised the availability of soil information and led to improved agricultural practices with reduced environmental impacts and enhanced security of the world’s soil.”

2021 Australian Research Council Laureate Fellowship

The aim of this program is to deliver a comprehensive systematic soil monitoring system within a world-first soil security framework.

2024 Member of the Order of Australia (AM)

For significant service to soil science through research and education, and to the development of digital mapping techniques.

2026 Fellow of the Royal Society (FRS)

“A globally recognised leader in soil and environmental earth science, renowned for pioneering work in pedometrics and digital soil mapping. His research has transformed how soils are understood, measured, and managed, advancing precision agriculture and strengthening global soil security. By developing innovative theories and models, he has improved agricultural productivity while reducing environmental impacts.”

== Personal life ==
Something McBratney achieved as a "wee boy in Whithorn" outshines the Royal Society fellowship honour, the BBC reported in 2026 "I still think my greatest accolade was winning a certificate from the Burns Federation for reciting Scots poetry when I was about eight," he said "I treasure that".
