= The Plant Genome =

- Discipline: Agronomy
- Language: English
- Edited by: Henry Nguyen

Publication details
- History: Since 2008
- Publisher: Wiley on behalf of the Crop Science Society of America (United States)
- Frequency: Triannual
- Open access: Yes
- License: Creative Commons Attribution
- Impact factor: 3.8 (2024)

Standard abbreviations
- ISO 4: Plant Genome

Indexing
- CODEN: PGMWAT
- ISSN: 1940-3372
- OCLC no.: 8117201878

Links
- Journal homepage; Online access; Online archive

The Plant Genome is a triannual peer-reviewed scientific journal covering all aspects of plant genomics. It is published by Wiley on behalf of the Crop Science Society of America. Since 2013, it is available online only. The journal began as a supplement to Crop Science from 2006 to 2008 and was established as a stand-alone open-access journal later in 2008.

== Abstracting and indexing ==
The journal is abstracted and indexed in:

- Biological Abstracts
- BIOSIS Previews
- CAB Abstracts
- Current Contents/Agriculture, Biology & Environmental Sciences
- Embase
- Index Medicus/MEDLINE/PubMed
- Science Citation Index Expanded
- Scopus

According to the Journal Citation Reports, the journal has a 2024 impact factor of 3.8.
