= Percy Edgar Brown =

Percy Edgar Brown (1885–1937) was a soil scientist at Iowa State University, Ames, Iowa. Brown is perhaps best known for the book, Soils of Iowa, which was published in 1936. The classic map, "Landform Regions of Iowa," was originally published in this text.

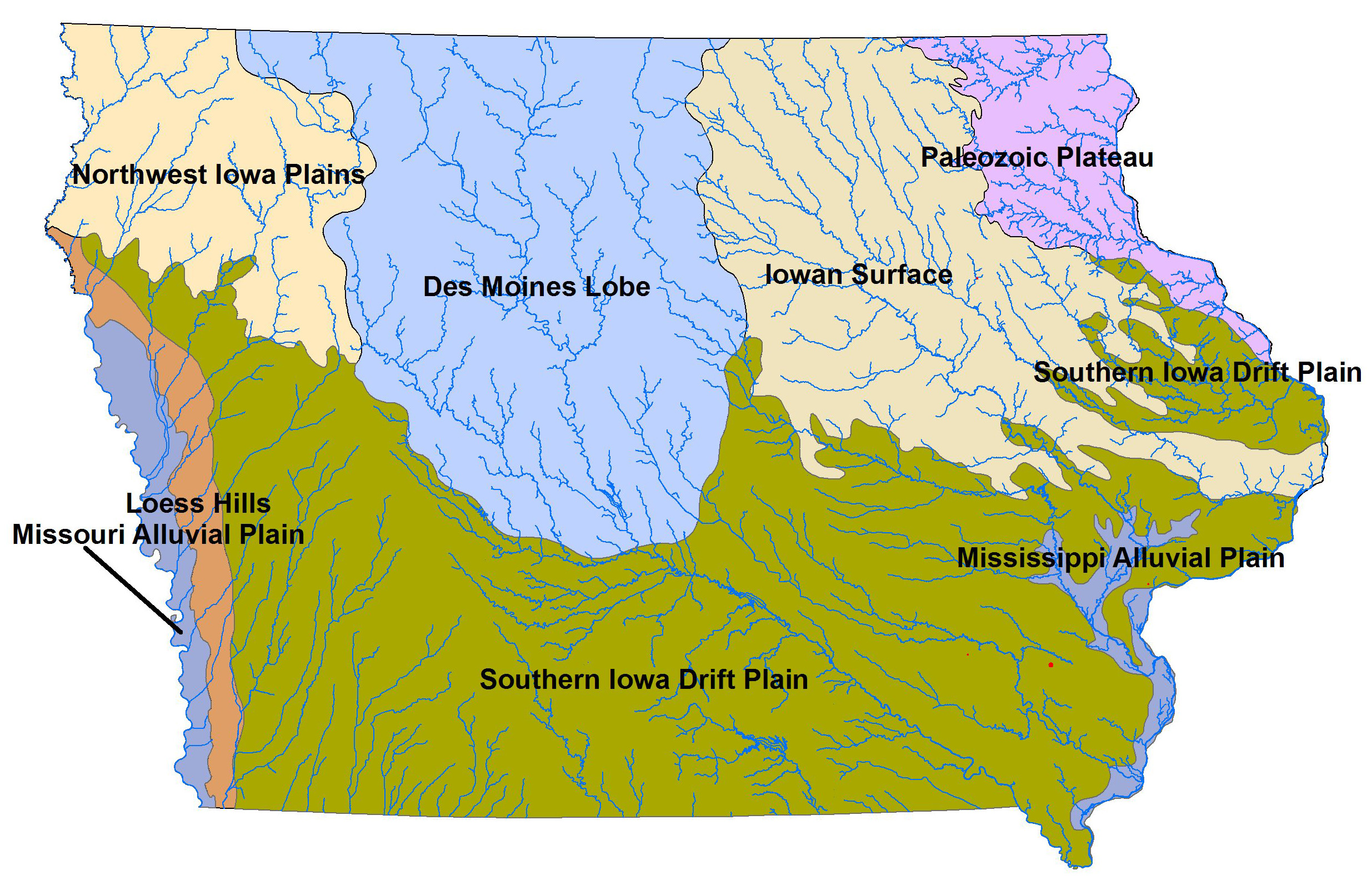
Landform Regions of Iowa

Brown was born on a farm at Woodbridge Township, New Jersey, on October 9, 1885. He graduated from Woodbridge High School in 1902. From 1906 to 1910 Dr. Brown served as assistant soil chemist and bacteriologist at the New Jersey Agricultural Experiment Station under J. G. Lipman. On several occasions he mentioned that no man had influenced him more than Lipman.

Brown received his B.S. (1909), A.M. (1909), and Ph.D. (1912) from Rutgers University. In 1910 he joined the Iowa State College faculty as Assistant Professor (1910-1912) of soil bacteriology. Soon after he was promoted to Associate Professor (1912-1914) and Professor (1914-1932). In 1932 he became the head of the Department of Agronomy and served until his sudden death from a heart attack in 1937. His major interests of study included soil bacteriology, soil fertility and soil survey. During his time at Iowa State he was heavily involved in establishing curriculum in the soil science discipline.

Brown was also heavily involved in numerous professional organizations including: the American Association for the Advancement of Science, the Iowa Academy of Science, the American Chemical Society, the American Society of Agronomy, the American Soil Survey Association, the Soil Science Society of America, and the International Society of Soil Scientists. He was also consulting editor of Soil Science and business manager and Editor-in-Chief of the Iowa State College Journal of Science.

Brown held the office of secretary-treasurer for the American Society of Agronomy from 1920 until 1937 except in 1932 when he served as president. He was also one of the first 10 "fellows" elected in 1925. After the establishment of the Soil Science Society of America in 1935 he served as secretary-treasurer and also served as the treasurer of the international Society of Soil Scientists. Due to Brown's great contribution to the American Society of Agronomy, J. D. Luckett, one time Editor of the Journal of American Society of Agronomy, stated, "I feel that the American Society of Agronomy and all that it stands for today is one of the splendid monuments that Dr. Brown has left to his enduring memory."
