= Alexander von Humboldt Medal (EGU) =

The Alexander von Humboldt Medal is awarded annually by the European Geosciences Union to scientists "who have performed research in developing regions for the benefit of people and society through which they have achieved exceptional international standing in geosciences and planetary and space sciences, defined in their widest senses".

It was established in 2006 and is named in honour of Alexander von Humboldt, the Prussian geographer.

== Recipients ==
Source: EGU

- 2006: Patricio Aceituno
- 2007: Liu Tungsheng
- 2008: no award
- 2009: Rafael Navarro-González
- 2010: Carlos A. Nobre
- 2011: no award
- 2012: Robin T. Clarke
- 2013: no award
- 2014: Pradeep Mujumdar
- 2015: Hubert H. G. Savenije
- 2016: Jean W. A. Poesen
- 2017: Johan Bouma
- 2018: Filippo Giorgi
- 2020: Bojie Fu
- 2021: Manfred R. Strecker
- 2024: Subimal Ghosh
- 2025: Sachchida Nand Tripathi

== See also ==
- List of geophysicists
- List of geophysics awards
- List of prizes named after people
