= John Mortvedt =

American soil scientist (1932–2012)

- Born: January 25, 1932; Dell Rapids, South Dakota, US
- Died: March 13, 2012 (aged 80); Fort Collins, Colorado, US
- Resting place: Stordahl Cemetery, Dell Rapids; 43.793045°N 96.719495°W
- Education: University of Wisconsin–Madison; PhD soil chemistry 1962; South Dakota State University; MS soil science 1959; BS agronomy 1953
- Known for: foremost authority on micronutrient fertilizer; SSSA President, Editor-in-Chief, Board of Directors, and Executive Committee
- Spouse: Marlene nee Fodness (m. 1955)
- Children: 3
- Awards: TVA Bronze Honor; SSSA Fellow, Distinguished Service, Professional Service; ASA Fellow, AAAS Fellow
- Scientific career
- Fields: soil science
- Institutions: Tennessee Valley Authority; Colorado State University
- Thesis: The Effect of Manganese and Copper on the Growth of Streptomyces Scabies and the Incidence of Potato Scab (1962)
- Doctoral advisor: K. C. Berger

John Jacob Mortvedt (January 25, 1932 – March 13, 2012) was an American soil scientist who worked with micronutrient fertilizer.

== Early life and education ==
Born and raised on a Dell Rapids, South Dakota, farm to Ernest and Clara Mortvedt, John Mortvedt earned a bachelor's degree in agronomy from South Dakota State University in 1953. After a brief return to the farm, Mortvedt was a pilot for a US Army aviation unit stationed in Colorado, between World War II and the Korean War. He married Marlene Fodness in Rapid City, South Dakota, on January 23, 1955. Mortvedt studied for a master's degree in soil science from SDSU and graduated in 1959, continuing for his Ph.D. in soil chemistry from the University of Wisconsin–Madison in 1962. Mortvedt wrote his thesis on “the effect of manganese and copper on the growth of Streptomyces scabies and the incidence of potato scab.”

== Career ==
John Mortvedt joined the Tennessee Valley Authority (TVA) and worked in Muscle Shoals, Alabama, for thirty years. While at TVA he also collaborated with the Department of Agriculture's Agricultural Research Service. Mortvedt earned the TVA Bronze Award as a soil chemist in the Agricultural Research Department. A senior scientist in Alabama until 1992, John transferred to the TVA Field Programs Department in Colorado to be a regional manager for the Rocky Mountain region. Mortvedt retired from TVA on July 9, 1993, and joined Colorado State University as an Extension Specialist and Professor Emeritus. At Colorado State University, Mortvedt supervised fertilizer suggestion revisions for the state's major crops.

Mortvedt was elected president of the Soil Science Society of America and served on its board of directors, executive committee, and as its editor-in-chief. He was awarded fellowships in the American Association for the Advancement of Science (1989), American Society of Agronomy, and Soil Science Society of America.

== Legacy ==
After his death in 2012, the Micronutrient Manufacturers Association named its Mortvedt Award in honor of John, calling him the "leading researcher and educator on micronutrients in crop production".

== Bibliography ==
In addition to two patents, John Mortvedt published more than 100 papers and book chapters. Among them are:

- Mortvedt, John J. (1977). *Micronutrients in Agriculture.*. Soil Science Society of America.
- Mortvedt, John J.; Follett, Roy H.; Murphy, Larry S. (January 1999). Fertilizer technology and application. Meister Pub. Co. ISBN 978-1-892829-03-0.
- Mortvedt, John J. (31 August 1999). "Chapter 2: Bioavailability of Micronutrients". In Malcolm E. Sumner (ed.). Handbook of Soil Science. CRC Press. ISBN 978-0-8493-3136-7.
- Mortvedt, John J. (1997). Dahlia Greidinger International Symposium on Fertilization and the Environment. Technion, Israel Institute of Technology.
- Mortvedt, John J.; Giordano, Paul M. (1970). Application of Micronutrients Alone Or with Macronutrient Fertilizers.
- Mortvedt, John J.; Woodruff, James R. (23 July 1993). "Chapter 10: Technology and Application of Boron Fertilizers for Crops". In Umesh C. Gupta (ed.). Boron and Its Role in Crop Production. CRC Press. ISBN 978-0-8493-6582-9.
- Mortvedt, John J. (28 June 1991). "Chapter 8: Sequestration and Chelation". In Palgrave (ed.). Fluid Fertilizer Science and Technology. CRC Press. ISBN 978-0-8247-7703-6.
- Mortvedt, John J. (13 February 1997). "Chapter 11: Sources and Methods of Molybdenum Fertilization for Crops". In Umesh C. Gupta (ed.). Molybdenum in Agriculture. Cambridge University Press. ISBN 978-0-521-57121-0.
