= William L. Brown (geneticist) =

American geneticist (1913–1991)

William Lacy Brown (July 16, 1913 – March 8, 1991) was an American geneticist notable for breeding programs in maize, sorghum, soybeans and wheat. He was president, chairman and chief executive of Pioneer Hi-Bred International. He was also a director of the Rockefeller Foundation's advisory committee on maize. Brown was elected to the National Academies of Science. The National Academies Press said that Brown "made significant and lasting contributions to increasing and stabilizing food production worldwide".

== Career and life ==
Brown received his Ph.D. from Washington University in St. Louis in 1941. For almost his entire career of 40 years, he was with Pioneer Hi-Bred International, one of the world's largest manufacturers of hybrid seed corn.

== Awards and distinctions ==
- Fellow, American Society of Agronomy, 1970
- Fellow, Iowa Academy of Science, 1970
- Fellow, Drake University, 1970
- Agronomic Service Award, American Society of Agronomy, 1979
- Distinguished Fellow, Iowa Academy of Science, 1980
- Distinguished Alumni Award, Bridgewater College, 1980
- Member, National Academy of Sciences, 1980
- Honorary Phi Beta Kappa, Drake University, 1981
- President, Crop Science Society of America, 1982
- Distinguished Economic Botanist, Society for Economic Botany, 1982
- Distinguished Alumni Award, Washington University in St. Louis, 1983
- Genetics and Plant Breeding Award for Industry, Crop Science Society of America, 1986
- Henry Shaw Medal, Missouri Botanical Garden, 1986
- Honorary D.Sc., Drake University, 1987
- Fellow, American Association for the Advancement of Science, 1989
- Honorary Ph.D., West Virginia University, 1989
