= Filippo Giorgi =

Italian physicist

- Born: February 9, 1959 (age 67); Sulmona, Italy
- Education: University of L'Aquila; Georgia Institute of Technology
- Awards: Dante Alighieri Prize
- Scientific career
- Workplaces: IBM Scientific Center; National Center for Atmospheric Research; Joint Research Centre; International Centre for Theoretical Physics; Intergovernmental Panel on Climate Change; Earth System Physics Section

Filippo Giorgi (born February 9, 1959) is an Italian physicist and an author of 19 chapters and over 250 peer-reviewed articles which he published in such journals as Journal of Geophysical Research, Climate Dynamics and many others.

== Biography ==
Giorgi was born in Sulmona, Italy. He earned his Bachelor's of Science and his Master's degrees from the University of L'Aquila in 1982. Four years later he received his Ph.D. from the Georgia Institute of Technology. From February to September 1982, he worked as research fellow at the IBM Scientific Center in Rome, Italy. From January 1983 to August 1984, he worked at his alma mater as a research assistant. He had the same position at the National Center for Atmospheric Research (NCAR) in Boulder, Colorado from August 1984 to June 1986. Later on, he became a postdoctoral fellow at NCAR until October 1987. At that time, he became a level one scientist there, reaching a level two position in July 1991.

He served at NCAR from September 1992 to 1997. During these years, he held joint positions at other institutes. He was a visiting professor at the Joint Research Centre in Ispra for all of 1993. From July 1994 to April 1998, he worked at his alma mater again, this time as a level three scientist. Beginning in 1998, he started work as a senior scientist at the Abdus Salams' International Centre for Theoretical Physics in Trieste. He served as head of the Physics of Weather and Climate Group there from May 1998 until August 2005. Between April 2002 and September 2008, he was a vice-chair at the Intergovernmental Panel on Climate Change (IPCC), an organisation that was a co-recipient of the 2007 Nobel Peace Prize. He was head of the Earth System Physics Section of the International Centre for Theoretical Physics between 2005 and 2024, when he became emeritus scientist.

== Awards ==
In 1982 he became IBM research fellow and ten years later was nominated for the Outstanding Publication Award from the National Center for Atmospheric Research. In 2004 he was listed by the Institute for Scientific Information as a highly cited researcher and in 2008 he was awarded both the Dante Alighieri Prize from the Dante Alighieri Society and the same year became a recipient of the gold medal for Civic Merits from Province of L'Aquila.

In 2018 he received the Alexander von Humboldt Medal from the European Geosciences Union for outstanding research on modelling regional climate change.
