= Rafiq Ahmad =

Pakistani botanist and plant physiologist

Rafiq Ahmad (1927–2023) was a Pakistani botanist and plant physiologist.

== Life ==
Ahmad was born on November 2, 1927. He earned a bachelor's degree in botany, chemistry, and zoology from Aligarh Muslim University in 1949 and an MSc in botany from the University of the Punjab in 1952. He later studied radioactive isotope tracer techniques at Oak Ridge in the United States and completed a PhD in plant physiology at Ohio State University in 1959.

Ahmad served as a professor, chairman of the Department of Botany, dean of the Faculty of Science, registrar, and director of the Institute of Environmental Studies at the University of Karachi. His research focused on plant mineral nutrition, biosaline agriculture, and the growth of plants under saline and arid conditions.

Ahmad was elected a fellow of the Pakistan Academy of Sciences and the Third World Academy of Sciences.

== Selected publications ==
- Prospects for Biosaline Research (1986)
- Saline Agriculture at Coastal Sandy Belt (1987)
- Saline Agriculture: Salt-Tolerant Plants for Developing Countries (1990)
- Trees, Shrubs and Grasses for Saltlands: An Annotated Bibliography (1999)
- Prospects for Saline Agriculture (2002)
