= George Nelson Coffey =

American pedologist

- Born: January 17, 1875; Patterson, North Carolina, U.S.
- Died: October 4, 1967 (aged 92); Wooster, Ohio, U.S.
- Education: Ph. D.
- Alma mater: University of North Carolina; George Washington University
- Occupation: Pedologist
- Spouse: Clara Estella Kean
- Parent(s): Elijah Coffey; Mary Ann Nelson

George Nelson Coffey (January 17, 1875 − October 4, 1967) was an American pedologist.

George was born in Patterson, North Carolina; the son of Elijah Coffey and Mary Ann Nelson. He matriculated to the University of North Carolina, where he studied geology and chemistry. From 1899 to 1900, he worked as an assistant in the university's geology laboratory, then graduated cum laude in 1900 with a bachelor's degree in philosophy.

Following his graduation, he went to work as a field assistant for the Bureau of Soils in the Department of Agriculture. He held this position for the next four years, where he was co-author of 13 soil survey reports covering the states of Illinois, Iowa, Kansas, North Carolina, and Ohio. In 1905, he was placed in charge of soil classification and correlation for the Bureau, during which he became aware of the need for a better classification system based on soil properties rather than the geology. This need prompted him to perform graduate studies, and he received an M.S. from George Washington University in 1907, with the Master's thesis The Basis of Soil Classification.

In 1909, he was named President of the American Society of Agronomy, becoming the second president of that recently created institution. During his term he attempted to introduce the ideas of Russian geologist Vasily Dokuchaev to American soil scientists, emphasizing a need to focus more on the properties of soil rather than exclusively studying their geology. He served as chairman of a committee of 15 people tasked with creating a more uniform system of nomenclature and classification for soils in the United States and Canada.

George Coffey was the first person to publish a national soil map of the United States, which appeared in the USDA Bureau of Soils Bulletin 85 in 1912. However, it was not released as an "official" map by the Bureau as it did not conform to the prevailing soil classification concepts of the first Bureau Chief, Milton Whitney. Coffey had resigned from the Bureau in 1911 to join the Ohio Agricultural Experiment Station, and it would remain for Curtis F. Marbut to bring Dokuchaev's ideas to prominence. Coffey was awarded a Ph.D. in geology from the George Washington University in 1912 with a thesis titled A Study of Soils in the United States.

While at Wooster, Coffey performed studies on erosion in Ohio. The area had been subject to multiple glaciations, which had resulted in impacts to drainage. This led to a lifelong passion for the subject, and he would publish a series of papers regarding drainage. He was also involved in fertilizers trials, particularly with regard to the effects of different soil types. On April 22, 1914, he was married to Clara Estella Kean in Wooster, Ohio. He left Ohio for a position at the University of Illinois, where he became Assistant State Leader for County Farm Advisors. He published his last article in the Journal of the American Society of Agronomy in 1916, leaving soil science for a business career in order to be closer to his family.
