= Crop Science (journal) =

Peer-reviewed scientific journa

- Discipline: Agronomy
- Language: English
- Edited by: Glen Ritchie

Publication details
- History: 1961–present
- Publisher: Crop Science Society of America (United States)
- Frequency: Continuously
- Open access: Hybrid
- Impact factor: 1.9 (2024)

Standard abbreviations
- ISO 4: Crop Sci.

Indexing
- ISSN: 0011-183X (print); 1435-0653 (web)
- OCLC no.: 1027905051

Links
- Journal homepage; Online archive

Crop Science is a continuously published peer-reviewed scientific journal covering agronomy. It was established in 1961 by founding editor-in-chief H.L. Hamilton and is published by ACSESS (Alliance of Crop, Soil, and Environmental Science Societies) in partnership with Wiley. It is the official journal of the Crop Science Society of America. Since 2013, it is available online only.

Crop Science is the originator of two spin-off journals, The Plant Genome and the Journal of Plant Registrations. The former was published as a supplement to Crop Science from 2006 to 2008, and launched as a separate open access journal later that year. The Journal of Plant Registrations was established as a separate journal in 2007, featuring an expanded format for crop registrations describing newly developed plant varieties, parental lines, germplasms, genetic stocks, and populations.

As with most other professional scientific journals, papers undergo an initial screening by the editor, followed by peer review (where other scientists chosen by the associate editor with expertise in the subject matter will evaluate the paper), before publication. The identity of the reviewers is not known to the authors.

== Abstracting and indexing ==
The journal is abstracted and indexed in:

- AGRICOLA
- Biological Abstracts
- BIOSIS Previews
- CAB Abstracts
- Current Contents/Agriculture, Biology & Environmental Sciences
- ProQuest databases
- Science Citation Index Expanded
- Scopus

According to the Journal Citation Reports, the journal has a 2024 impact factor of 1.9.
