= Agronomy Journal =

- Discipline: Agriculture
- Language: English
- Edited by: Silvia Pampana

Publication details
- Former name: Journal of the American Society of Agronomy
- History: Since 1908
- Publisher: Wiley (publisher) on behalf of the American Society of Agronomy
- Frequency: Continuous
- Open access: Hybrid
- Impact factor: 2.0 (2024)

Standard abbreviations
- ISO 4: Agron. J.

Indexing
- ISSN: 0002-1962 (print); 1435-0645 (web)
- LCCN: sc78002133
- OCLC no.: 1250035250

Links
- Journal homepage; Online access; Online archive

The Agronomy Journal is a peer-reviewed scientific journal published by Wiley on behalf of the American Society of Agronomy. It covers all aspects of soil science, crop science, agroclimatology, agronomic modeling, production agriculture, and software. The editor-in-chief is Silvia Pampana (Università di Pisa). According to the Journal Citation Reports, the journal has a 2024 impact factor of 2.0.

== History ==
The journal was established in 1908 as the Journal of the American Society of Agronomy, obtaining its current name in January 1949 after a vote of the members.

== Abstracting and indexing ==
The journal is indexed and abstracted in:

- Science Citation Index Expanded
- Scopus
- ProQuest databases
- EBSCO databases
