= National Agricultural Research Centre =

Pakistani research institute

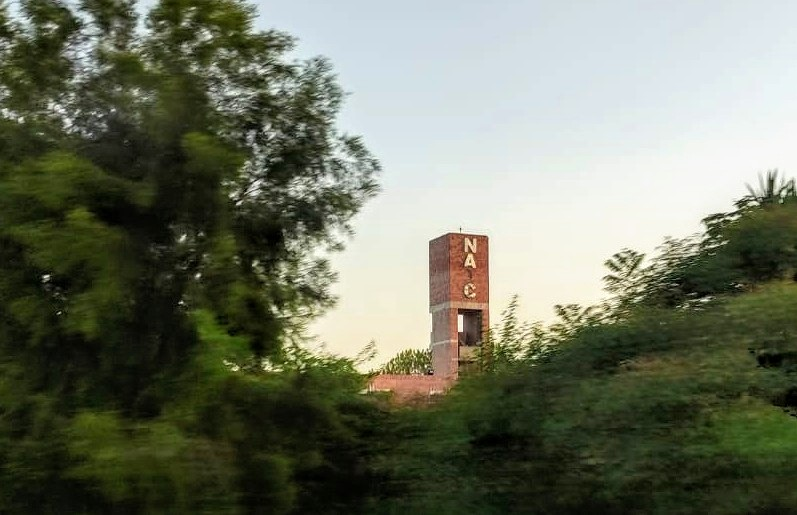
NARC, Islamabad

National Agricultural Research Centre (NARC) (Urdu: قومی مرکز برائے تحقیقِ زراعت) is a research institution of the Pakistan Agricultural Research Council (PARC) based in Islamabad, Pakistan. It works in collaboration with Ministry of National Food Security and Research.

== Research institutes ==
- Crop Sciences Institute (CSI)
- Horticulture Research Institute (HRI)
- Agricultural Engineering Institute (AEI)
- Honeybee Research Institute (HBRI), started by Rafiq Ahmad
- Social Sciences Research Institute (SSRI)
- Institute of Plant & Environmental Protection (IPEP)
- Food Sciences Research Institute (FSRI)
- Land Resources Research Institute (LRRI)
- Animal Sciences Institute (ASI)
- Crops Diseases Research Institute (CDRI)
- Climate Energy & Water Research Institute (CEWRI)
- Bio Resources Conservation Institute (BCI)
- National Institute of Genomics & Advanced Biotechnology (NIGAB)
- Rangeland Research Institute (RRI)

== Events ==
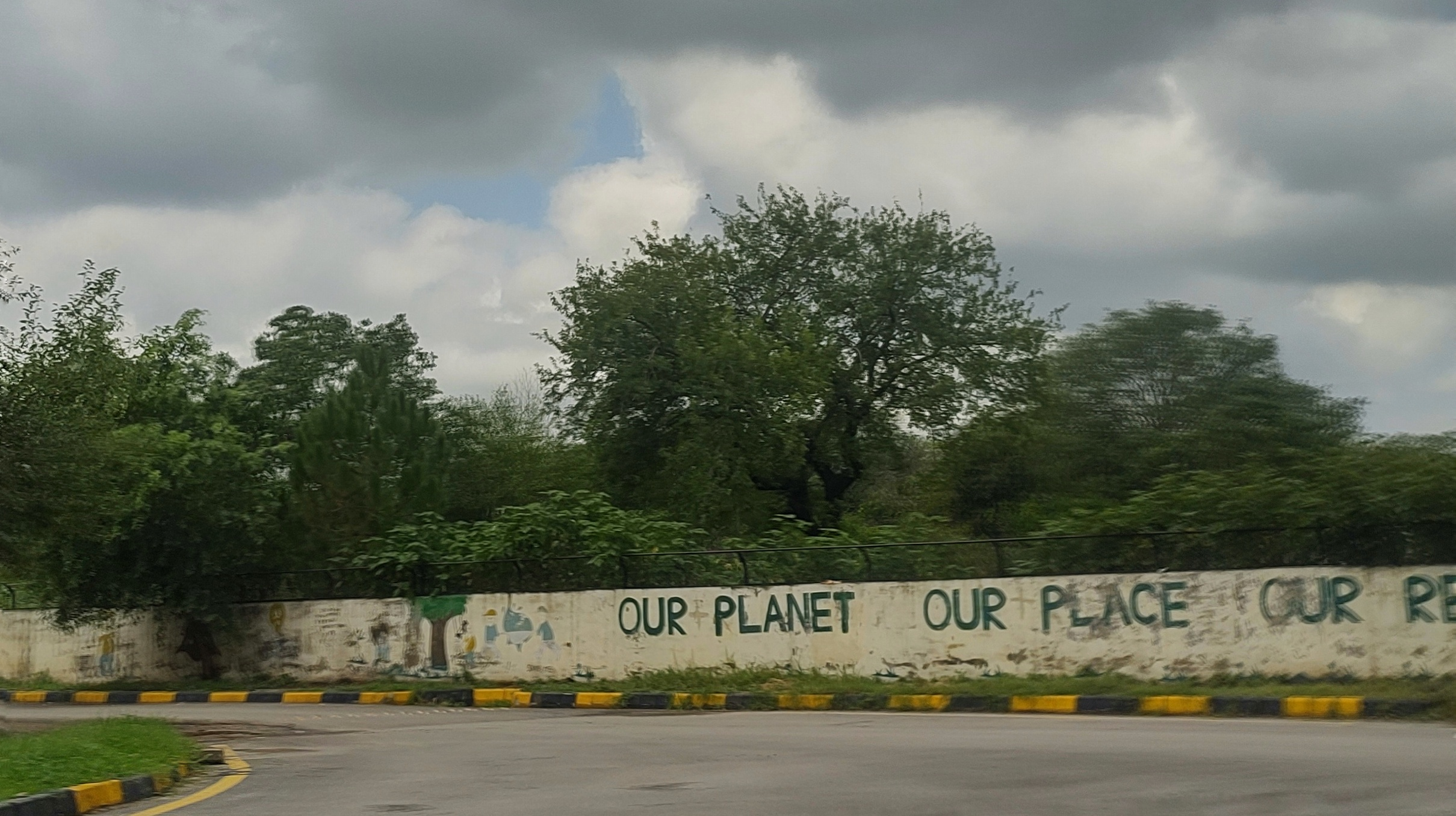
Protest art on boundary wall of NARC against converting its land into a residential housing society

- In 2015, Chief Justice of Pakistan intervened and took notice on a land issue that involved converting land owned by National Agricultural Research Centre (NARC) into a residential housing society scheme.
- In October 2019, World Food Day was observed at an event at the National Agricultural Research Centre (NARC) in Islamabad. This event was organized by the United Nations Food & Agriculture Organization, Pakistan's Ministry of National Food Security and Research, Pakistan Agricultural Research Council (PARC) and the World Food Programme (WFP). The theme for 2019 was – 'Our actions are our future: healthy diets for a zero hunger world'.
