= Thomas Lyttleton Lyon =

American soil scientist (1869–1938)

- Born: February 17, 1869; Pittsburgh, Pennsylvania
- Died: October 7, 1938 (aged 69); Ithaca, New York
- Education: Ph.D.
- Alma mater: Cornell University
- Occupation: Agronomist
- Spouse: Bertha Laura Clark
- Children: John Lyttleton Lyon; George Clark Lyon
- Parent(s): James B. Lyon; Anna M. Lyttleton

Thomas Lyttleton Lyon (17 February 1869 – October 7, 1938) was an American soil scientist who wrote on the nitrogen cycle. He was a professor at Cornell University and served as secretary of the American Society of Agronomy from 1907 to 1909. Lyon was a fellow of the American Association for the Advancement of Science, and a member of the American Chemical Society. His Principle of Soil Management went through 10 editions.

== Biography ==
He was born on February 17, 1869, in Allegheny County, Pennsylvania, in the suburbs of Pittsburgh, to James B. Lyon and Anna M. Lyttleton He attended Pittsburgh High School and then Cornell University, graduating BSA 1891. Thomas became an instructor in chemistry at the University of Nebraska, while working as an assistant chemist for the University's Experimental Station, specializing in soil chemistry. In 1893 he went to Germany to study with Bernhard Tollens at the University of Göttingen for a year. He then returned to the University of Nebraska as an instructor and in 1895, on the death of C. I. Ingersoll, the agriculturist and department director, became assistant professor there.

At the Trans-Mississippi exhibition of 1898, Lyon was in charge of the dairy test, and he regularly exhibited at the Nebraska State Fair. In 1901 he was promoted to an associate director. In 1899 he married Miss Bertha Clark, the daughter of banker John R. Clark of Lincoln, Nebraska. They had two sons: John and George. In 1906 he became chairman of the department of Soil Technology at the College of Agriculture of Cornell University. During his eleven years of service at the university, he was instrumental in the distribution of durum wheat, Kherson oat from south Russia, bromegrass, and various varieties of early maturing corn in the state. He also collaborated with the U.S. Department of Agriculture in plant breeding activities.

In 1904 he was awarded a Ph.D. from Cornell with a thesis titled, "A Method for Improving the Quality of Wheat for Bread Making". He joined the faculty of Cornell in 1906, becoming professor of Experimental Agronomy. From 1907–1909, he served as secretary for the American Society of Agronomy; initially on a temporary basis during the foundation of the society, then being elected to the position in the following years. In 1912, Professor Lyon was named head of the department of soil technology at the Cornell University College of Agriculture.

At Cornell's Caldwell Field, Professor Lyon performed numerous field studies, including lysimeter and plat experiments. In 1913, he and fellow Cornell Professor James A. Bizzell were awarded the Howard N. Potts Medal for their paper, "The Relation of Certain Non-Leguminous Plants to the Nitrate Contents in Soil". Beginning in 1907, he published various textbooks about soil science.

Lyon remained at Cornell until retiring as Emeritus Professor in 1937. He died in 1938 at Ithaca, New York.

== Bibliography ==
Thomas L. Lyon authored or co-authored the following works:

- Experiments in the Culture of the Sugar Beet in Nebraska (1893)
- Pasture, Meadow, and Forage Crops in Nebraska (1904), with A. S. Hitchcock
- Improving the Quality of Wheat (1904)
- Examining and Grading Grains (1907), with E. G. Montgomery
- Water-soluble Matter in Soils Sterilized and Reinoculated (1913), with J. A. Bizzell
- Soils, Their Properties and Management (1915), with E. O. Fippin and H. O. Buckman
- Soils and Fertilizers (1919)
- Liberation of Organic Matter by Roots of Growing Plants (1921), with J. K. Wilson
- The Nature and Properties of Soils : A College Text of Edaphology (1922), with H. O. Buckman
- The Principle of Soil Management, with Elmer Otterbein Fippin (1879-1949)
