= Ana Maria Primavesi =

Brazilian-Austrian agronomist (1920–2020)

- Born: Annemarie Conrad; 3 October 1920; Austria
- Died: 5 January 2020 (aged 99); São Paulo, Brazil
- Burial place: Congonhas Cemetery
- Occupation: agronomist
- Spouse: Artur von Primavesi
- Awards: IFOAM One World Award for lifetime achievement

Ana Maria Primavesi (born Annemarie Conrad; 3 October 1920 – 5 January 2020) was an agronomist, researcher and educator of soil science and especially the ecological management of tropical Brazilian soil.

== Biography ==
Born on a large farm in an Austrian village in 1920, Primavesi fell in love with nature, inspired by her father. She studied at the Faculty of Natural Resources and Life Sciences of the University of Vienna, where she was one of only three women in her class. She went on to earn a doctorate in plant and soil nutrition.

While at school, she met fellow agronomy student Artur von Primavesi, who was of German origin whom she married in 1946. They had three children together. In 1949, they migrated to Brazil because Primavesi, like many other people, was threatened with forced deportation by the Russians in Austria, which had become a very unstable country in the years immediately following World War II.

=== Soil science ===
Primavesi was a pioneer in soil preservation and the recovery of degraded areas in the tropics. She approached soil management in a way designed to work naturally with the farm's environment, which was particularly important in Brazil. According to her research, the most appropriate type of agriculture there would encourage farmers to favor treating the soil so it has high levels of organic matter, avoids movement, controls pests using biological techniques, and avoids chemical inputs by substituting organic additives such as green manure. She called her methods agroecology.

In a 2016 interview, she explained one aspect of tropical soils:

"In the tropics, 80% of microorganisms found in the soil are fungi that produce enormous amounts of antibiotics and have their life inhibited below 15 centimeters. In the past, when farmers worked with an ox or donkey plow, the plow did not go below 12 or 15 cm and the land remained more or less in the superficial part. Now with the mechanical traction plow, you can reach 30 or 40 cm, put the dead part on top that is broken up by the rain, enters the ground and clogs the pores. There the land is hard, compacted. Everyone asks me what to do with compaction. In the tropics, you cannot work the land deeply at all. The work has to be superficial because the ground below is dead."

=== Life in Brazil ===
Primavesi and her husband were professors at the Federal University of Santa María, in the southernmost state of Brazil. There, she helped organize the first postgraduate course in organic agriculture. She was also the founder of the Organic Agriculture Association (AAO), one of the first associations of organic producers in Brazil.

Her book "Ecological management alone: agriculture in tropical regions" is still considered a reference work in agricultural sciences.

After she retired from teaching, she and her husband moved to their own property in Itaí, located in the Brazilian state of São Paulo. After her husband's death in 1977, Primavesi stayed there to put into practice her research about organic agriculture. She lived on the farm for more than 30 years and authored multiple publications about her research and agriculture work. Under Primavesi's management, her land – which was badly eroded when bought – was rejuvenated with springs, forests and agricultural areas. Her success there led to many speaking invitations and research projects around the world.

Primavesi died in São Paulo on 5 January 2020 at the age of 99 from heart problems. She is buried in the city's Congonhas Cemetery.

== Distinctions ==
- 2012: One World Award of the International Federation of Organic Agriculture Movements (IFOAM) for lifetime achievement.
- Honorary doctorates were awarded to Primavesi by several Brazilian universities.

== Selected bibliography ==
Dr. Primavesi published 12 books and 94 unpublished scientific texts and articles.

- 2008. Gaia and Climate Change: A Theology of Gift Events . Ed. Routledge, 168 p. ISBN 1134029586 , ISBN 9781134029587
- 2004. Gaia's Gift: Earth, Ourselves and God after Copernicus . Ed. Routledge, 160 p. ISBN 1134442645 , ISBN 9781134442645
- 2000. Sacred Gaia: Holistic Theology and Earth System Science Hardcover . With James Lovelock Ed. Routledge 224 p. ISBN 978-0415188333 ISBN 0415188334
- 1997. Agroecology: ecosphere, technosphere and agriculture. São Paulo: Nobel, 199 p. ISBN 8521309104
- 1995. From apocalypse to genesis: ecology, feminism, Christianity. With Antonio Martínez Riu. Ed. Herder, 384 p. ISBN 8425418682 , ISBN 9788425418686
- 1992. Sustainable agriculture: rural producer manual. São Paulo: Nobel, 142 p. ISBN 8521307306
- 1988. Ecological management of prague and doenças: alternative techniques for agricultural production and defense of the environment. São Paulo: Nobel, 137 p. ISBN 852130546X
- 1984. Ecological management of alone: to agriculture in tropical regions. 7th ed. São Paulo (SP): Nobel, 541 p. il. In Spanish: Ecological soil management: agriculture in tropical regions. With Jorge S. Molina. 5th ed. illustrates. "El Ateneo" Book Store Editorial, 499 p.

== See also ==
- Johanna Döbereiner, Brazilian agronomist
