= Mark A. Carleton =

American botanist and pathologist (1866–1925)

Mark Alfred Carleton
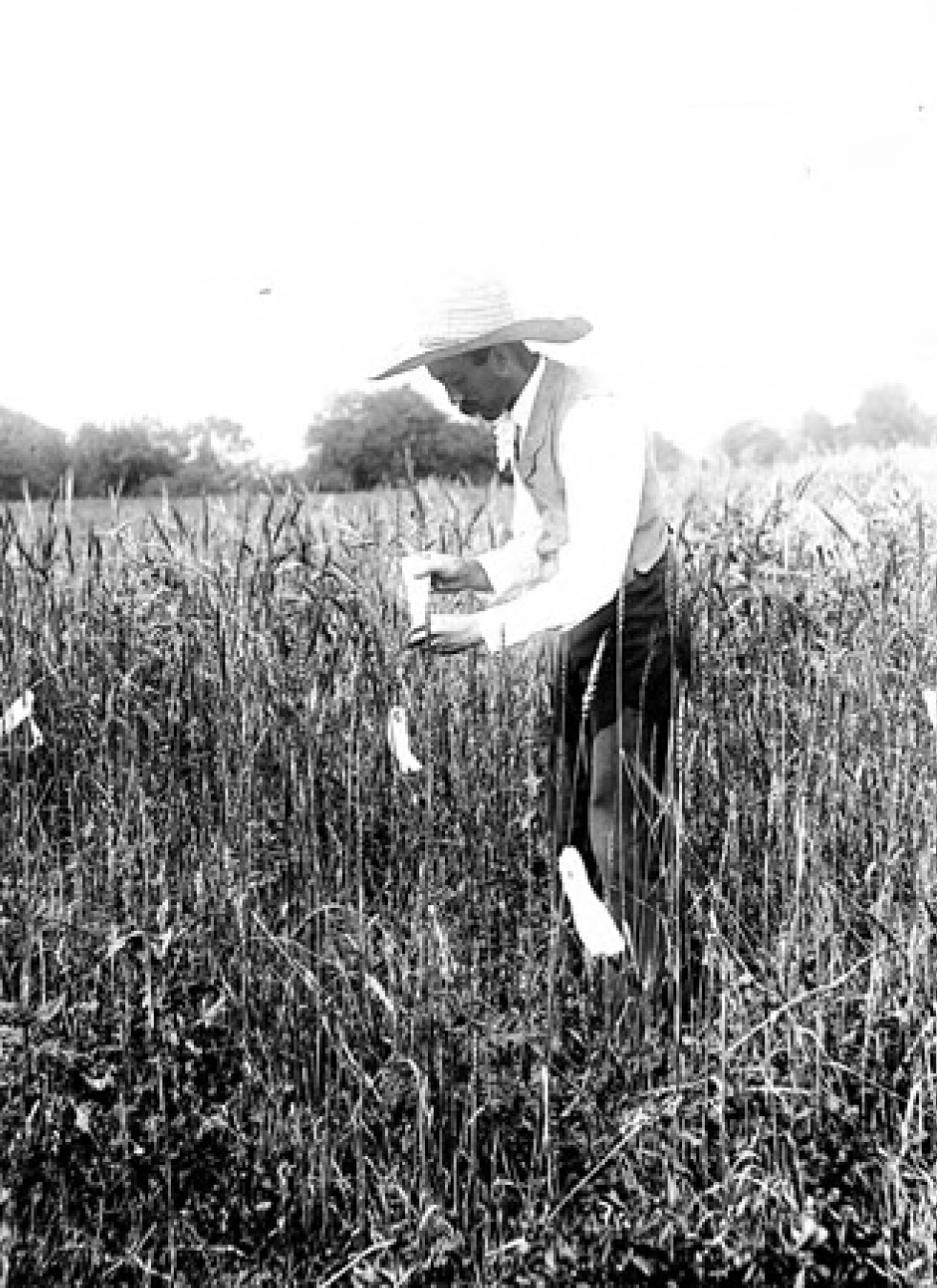
- Mark Carleton examining experimental wheat field at Garrett Park, Maryland, in 1899
- Born: 3 July 1866; Jerusalem, Ohio, United States
- Died: 25 April 1925 (aged 58); Paita, Peru
- Education: Kansas State University
- Scientific career
- Fields: Botany

Mark Alfred Carleton (Ohio, United States 7 March 1866 – Paita, Peru 25 April 1925) was an American botanist and plant pathologist, most notable for his introduction of hard red wheats and durum wheats from Russia into the American wheatbelt.

Carleton was born near Jerusalem, Monroe County, Ohio, but the family moved to Cloud County, Kansas, in 1876 where he worked on his father's farm. He attended Kansas State Agricultural College (now Kansas State University), graduating in 1887 with his bachelor's. For the next two years he taught natural history at Garfield University in Wichita. When funds ran out to pay him, he returned to Kansas State Agricultural College and acquired his master's degree in botany and plant cultivation. While there, he worked with A.S. Hitchcock on the study of plant rusts and published a number of papers, which, with Hitchcock's endorsement, got Carleton a job as an assistant pathologist in the Division of Vegetable Physiology and Pathology of the United States Department of Agriculture (USDA). In 1894 he issued the exsiccata Uredineae Americanae exsiccatae.

While at the USDA, Carleton continued his study of wheat rusts and noticed, inter alia, that the turkey red wheat grown in Kansas by the Mennonites survived where other varieties succumbed to wheat rusts. Turkey red wheat had been brought from Russia, so Carleton studied Russian agriculture and taught himself some of the Russian language. In 1898, the Department sent him to Russia, where he acquired a number of varieties of cereal grains to test in the United States. In July 1900 he returned to Russia and acquired several more cereal grains, predominantly wheat.

When the Division of Vegetable Physiology and Pathology became part of the Bureau of Plant Industry in 1901, Carleton was put in charge of the grain investigations section (head cerealist). Due to his belief that improvements in yield would be most likely from the introduction of new varieties, he concentrated on a program of experimental trials of various seed stocks. That combined with the seed distribution through the state agricultural colleges program meant that by 1919, it may not have been an exaggeration to say that 98% of the wheat grown in Kansas came from Carleton's seed stock.

Carleton become the first president of the American Society of Agronomy. In 1916, he published a textbook entitled The Small Grains which has been called masterly.

Carleton had married Amanda Elizabeth Faught, of Kingman, Kansas, in 1897 and they had four children. Finding it difficult to manage on a government salary, Carleton attempted to trade on his agricultural expertise with a wheat farm in Texas and a fruit farm in Florida. Unfortunately, neither one was a success. The family home was lost in a mortgage foreclosure. This was followed, in 1918, by his requested resignation from the Department of Agriculture for unethical behavior and conflicts of interest.

For the next several years Carleton worked for a number of agro-businesses including the United States Grain Corporation and the United Fruit Company. In 1925, while studying an infestation of pink boll weevils in the Peruvian cotton crop, he died of heart disease complicated by malaria.

Carleton was a member of the Botanical Society of America, the American Phytopathological Society, the American Genetic Association, the Kansas Academy of Science, and the Botanical and Biological Societies of Washington. He was a Fellow of the American Association for the Advancement of Science and received the distinguished French Ordre National du Mérite Agricole. He was inducted into the U.S. National Agricultural Hall of Fame on 27 April 1984.
