= Johan Bouma =

Dutch soil scientist

- Born: 29 October 1940 (age 85); Vrouwenparochie
- Education: Wageningen University and Research Centre
- Occupation: Soil scientist

Johannes "Johan" Bouma (born 29 October 1940) is a Dutch soil scientist. He worked at the Netherlands Soil Survey Institute from 1975 to 1983 and was professor of soil science at Wageningen University and Research Centre between 1983 and 2002.

== Career ==
Bouma was born on 29 October 1940 in Vrouwenparochie. He studied soil science at Wageningen University and Research Centre, obtaining his degree cum laude in 1966. He continued studying at the university and obtained his PhD in soil management in 1969. Bouma subsequently moved to the United States and became a postdoc at the University of Wisconsin–Madison, where he also held teaching positions until his return to the Netherlands in 1975. There, he became head of the soil physics department of Netherlands Soil Survey Institute. From 1983 to 1986 he served as adjunct director of the institute.

In 1986 Bouma was appointed professor of soil science at Wageningen University and Research Centre. As professor he specialized in soil inventorisation and land evaluation. He retired in 2002. From 1998 to 2003 he was member of the Dutch Scientific Council for Government Policy. In 2020 together with former Dutch Minister for Agriculture Cees Veerman he was a part of think tank of the European Commission which published a vision called "Mission on Soil, Health and Food".

Bouma was elected a Fellow of the Soil Science Society of America in 1983 or 1985. He was elected a member of the Royal Netherlands Academy of Arts and Sciences in 1989. He was made an Officer in the Order of Orange-Nassau in 2001. In 2014 he won the Presidents Award of the Soil Science Society of America. Bouma won the 2017 Alexander von Humboldt Medal of the European Geosciences Union. During the 2018 World Congress of the International Union of Soil Sciences he was awarded the Dokuchaev Award. In 2019 a Festschrift was published in his honour.
