= Pakistan Agricultural Research Council =

- پاکستان زرعی تحقیقاتی کونسل
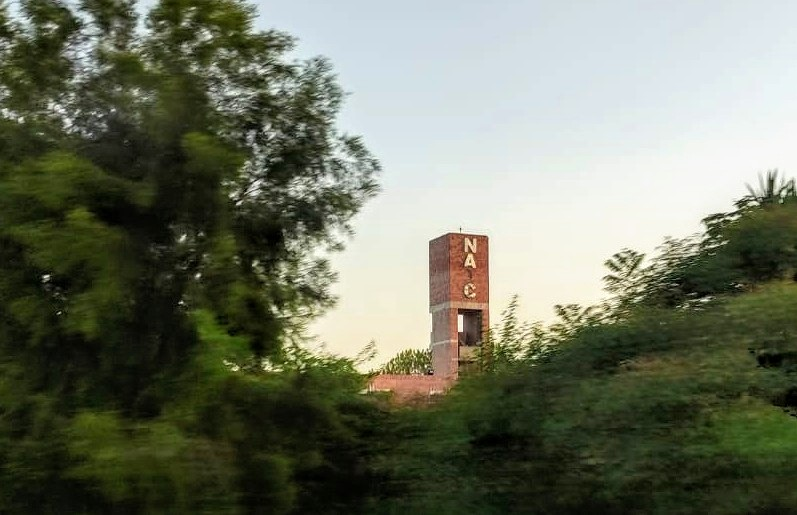
- NARC (PARC headquarters)
- Formation: 1981
- Type: Government of Pakistan agency
- Purpose: To promote agricultural research in Pakistan
- Headquarters: Islamabad, Pakistan
- Key people: Dr. Ghulam Muhammad Ali (Chairman), Dr. Shahzad Asad, Director General (NARC)
- Website: http://www.parc.gov.pk

The Pakistan Agricultural Research Council (PARC) (ہیئت برائے زرعی تحقیق پاکستان) is based in Islamabad, Pakistan.

== Mission and achievements ==
It works in collaboration with Ministry of National Food Security and Research which is headed by a Federal Minister, Tariq Bashir Cheema who is heading the ministry since April 2022. It is an apex agricultural research organization at the national level. Its main objective is to strengthen Pakistan's agricultural research system, comprising the federal and provincial components.

Dr. Ghulam Muhammad Ali is the current Chairman of PARC, a scientist. His visionary approach has taken PARC to real apex position. Dr. Ali is accompanied with the technical members for different divisions in PARC. Among them Dr. Imtiaz Hussain is Member of Plant Sciences Division, Dr. Shahid Maqsood Gill (Member Natural Resource Division), Dr, Zia ul Hasan (Member Animal Sciences Division), Dr. Ghulam Sadiq Afridi (Member Social Sciences Division). Agricultural Engineering Division is headed by Engineer Zulfiqar Ali. The technical assistance is provided by Dr. Faisal Sohail Fateh (Director Technical).

National Agricultural Research Centre is the largest research establishment under PARC in Islamabad. The Director General in charge is Dr. Shahzad Asad.

In 2019, Pakistan was able to produce 20 new high-yielding, disease resistant and climate change-resilient wheat and maize (also called corn) varieties. This was achieved mainly due to the partnership between the International Maize and Wheat Improvement Center and the Pakistan Agricultural Research Council (PARC). USAID, the US development agency also supported this project.

== Recent events ==
In October 2019, World Food Day was observed at an event at the National Agricultural Research Centre (NARC) in Islamabad. This event was organized by the United Nations Food & Agriculture Organization, Pakistan's Ministry of National Food Security and Research, Pakistan Agricultural Research Council (PARC) and the World Food Programme (WFP). The theme for 2019 was – 'Our actions are our future: healthy diets for a zero hunger world'.

== Divisions ==
It has seven major research division in conducting research according to the agro-ecological needs of the regions.

- National Agricultural Research Centre (NARC), Islamabad
- Southern Zone Agricultural Research Centre (SARC), Karachi
- Arid Zone Research Centre (AZRC), Quetta
- National Tea Research Institute (NTRI), Mansehra
- Sugar Crops Research Institute (SRI), Thatta
- Himalayan Agricultural Research Institute (HARI), Kaghan
- Mountain Agricultural Research Center (MARC), Juglote sai, Gilgit

== See also ==
- Pakistan Atomic Energy Commission
- International Centre for Genetic Engineering and Biotechnology
- National Institute for Biotechnology and Genetic Engineering
