= Rodrigo Arocena =

Uruguayan mathematician

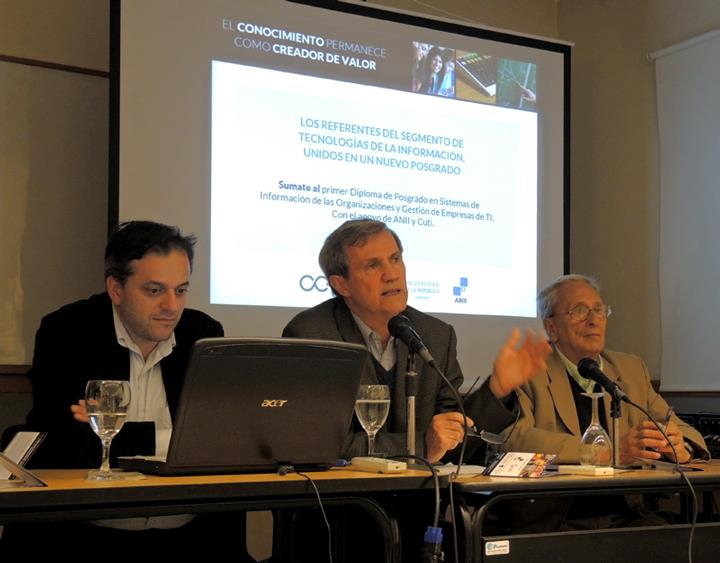
- Rodrigo Arocena (center) speaking alongside Rodrigo Arim
- Born: Rodrigo Arocena Linn; 23 February 1947 (age 78); Uruguay
- Occupation(s): Mathematician, professor, rector
- Spouse: Judith Sutz

Rodrigo Arocena Linn (born February 23, 1947, in Montevideo) is an Uruguayan mathematician, and rector of the University of the Republic between July 2006 and August 2014.

== Biography ==
Son of Germán Arocena Capurro and Mercedes Linn Davie, he comes from an Uruguayan upper-class family. His only brother Ignacio Arocena Linn disappeared on 20 August 1978 in Argentina, under circumstances surrounding the military regime. He began his academic life in the Faculty of Engineering at the University of the Republic of Uruguay. After a short time he began to teach at the Institute of Mathematics and Statistics, today called "Rafael Laguardia". During the military dictatorship in Uruguay, Arocena was exiled from the country, after spending a period in prison. After a journey to Buenos Aires he migrated to Caracas and obtained his doctorate in mathematics in 1979 from the Central University of Venezuela (UCV), under the direction of Mischa Cotlar in the area of functional analysis. More recently, Arocena changed the direction of his studies, dedicating himself to social sciences, obtaining at the UCV a second doctorate in development studies, in 1990. He acted as Professor of Science and Development at the Faculty of Science until his election as vice-chancellor of the University of the Republic of Uruguay. In 2007 the LGBT collective "Ovejas Negras" (Black Sheep) recognized him as Person of the Year.

== Publications ==
He is the author of more than 30 articles in the area of social science, dedicated to the study of the science in Uruguay and Latin America, and the themes of exile and technology. He has published 16 books (as author, co-author, or editor) regarding similar social themes. In the area of mathematics, between the years 1979 and 1998, he published some 40 articles about functional and harmonic analysis, unary operators and advancements.

== Vice-chancellor of the University ==
Rodrigo Arocena was elected vice-chancellor of the University of the Republic of Uruguay in the third vote (the last possible moment) in the General Assembly of the Senate. After the withdrawal of several candidates, opinions were divided between Rodrigo Arocena and Roberto Markarian, another mathematician who also began teaching in the Rafael Laguardia Institute of Mathematics and Statistics at the same time as Arocena. Arocena counted on the support of the majority of the students from the Federation of University Students of Uruguay in the General Assembly of the Senate to boost his candidacy, while Markarian had backing from the Teacher's Association of the University of the Republic (ADUR).
