= Soil Science Society of America =

American scientific organization

- Abbreviation: SSSA
- Formation: 1936; 90 years ago
- Type: NGO
- Purpose: membership-based organization to foster the transfer of knowledge and practices to sustain global soils.
- Headquarters: Madison, Wisconsin
- Services: "providing peer-reviewed, research-based publications, educational programs, certifications, and science policy initiatives..."
- Members: 6000
- Official language: English
- President: Aaron Daigh (2026)
- Main organ: Soil Science Society of America Journal
- Affiliations: Alliance of Crop, Soil, and Environmental Science Societies (ACSESS)
- Website: www.soils.org

The Soil Science Society of America (SSSA), is the largest soil-specific society in the United States. It was formed in 1936 from the merger of the Soils Section of the American Society of Agronomy and the American Soil Survey Association. The Soils Section of ASA became the official Americas section of the International Union of Soil Sciences in 1934, a notable role which SSSA continues to fulfill.

== Mission ==
The mission of the Society is: "1) to enhance the sustainability of soils, the environment, and society by integrating diverse scientific disciplines and principles in soil science for the wise stewardship of soil and natural resources, and 2) to advance the discovery, practice, and profession of soil science through excellence in the acquisition and application of knowledge to address challenges facing society, in the training and professional development of soil scientists, and in the education of, and communication to a diverse citizenry."

== Publications ==
SSSA publishes peer-reviewed scholarly journals, magazines, and books for a variety of audiences. SSSA publications are available in the Wiley Online Library.

- Soil Science Society of America Journal (SSSAJ, previously Soil Science Society of America Proceedings), published continuously, is the official publication of the Soil Science Society of America. The SSSAJ has an established emphasis on new developments and advancements in soil science and publishes papers on original research, issue papers, reviews, comments and letters to the editor, and book reviews. Topics include and extend beyond basic and applied soil research in agricultural, forest, wetlands, and urban settings.
- Vadose Zone Journal is a unique publication outlet for interdisciplinary research and assessment of the Critical Zone, which comprises the Earth's critical living surface down to groundwater. VZJ is a peer-reviewed, international journal publishing reviews, original research, and special sections across a wide range of disciplines.
- Journal of Environmental Quality (JEQ) is published by American Society of Agronomy, Crop Science Society of America and SSSA. Papers in JEQ cover various aspects of anthropogenic impacts on the environment, including terrestrial, atmospheric, and aquatic systems. Emphasis is given to the understanding of underlying processes rather than to monitoring. The journal publishes contributions under the headings of technical reports, reviews and analyses, environmental issues, short communications, dataset papers, special sections, letters to the editor, and book reviews.
- Natural Sciences Education (NSE, previously Journal of Natural Resources and Life Sciences Education and Journal of Agronomic Education) is a peer-reviewed international journal published online continuously during the year. Articles are written by and for educators in the areas of animal science, ecology, natural resources, agronomy, the environment, entomology, and more. NSE is published by the American Society of Agronomy with a number of cooperating societies including SSSA.
- CSA News is the official magazine for members of the American Society of Agronomy, Crop Science Society of America and Soil Science Society of America. It is a monthly member magazine featuring research highlights; membership, science policy, and meetings news; career and education information; and more.
- Books—SSSA publishes books for a wide audience—from children to scholars—with an emphasis on the Society's mission of advancing the knowledge of soils and their importance in the environment and society. SSSA publishes textbooks, professional guides, and special topics books.

== Certifications ==
The SSSA certification programs are voluntary and offer similar benefits to the public as soil science licensing programs. The certification programs set standards for knowledge, skills, and conduct that define the professions of soil science (Certified Professional Soil Scientist - CPSS) and soil classification (Certified Professional Soil Classifier - CPSC). These certifications provide clients, employers, and government agencies with a tool to help them choose professionals with the necessary skills to meet their needs.

== Policy ==
SSSA completed an assessment of the grand challenges facing the soil science discipline in 2011, identifying the most critical future research needs in soil science: climate change; food and energy security; waste treatment and water quality; and human and ecosystem health. More information on the grand challenges in soil science, including a list of short-, medium-, and long-term research goals, is available online.

=== Climate change ===
- Observations throughout the world make it clear that climate change is occurring, and rigorous scientific research concludes that the greenhouse gases emitted by human activities are the primary driver.

== Major initiatives ==
The UN Food and Agriculture Organization (FAO) declared 2015 as the International Year of Soils. In celebration of IYS, SSSA developed 12 monthly themes to help communicate the importance of soil. Each month features activities that help participants learn more about soils and a monthly thematic video to explain the topic.

Discover Soils SSSA's public website has a wealth of information about soils, their preservation and conservation. News topics include Food & Health, Climate, Environment, Culture & Technology, and Soil Basics. The Soils in the City tab helps urban residents connect more with soils in their environment.

"Dig it! The Secrets of Soil" SSSA is the founding sponsor of this 4000-square foot exhibition revealing the complex world of soil and how this underfoot ecosystem supports nearly every form of life. Originally developed by and displayed at the Smithsonian Institution's National Museum of Natural History, it is now hosted at various museums around the U.S.

SSSA created K-12 Education materials provided on Soils4Teachers.org. The website contains learning lessons and activities for K-12 teachers to use in the classroom. In addition, SSSA hosts www.soils4kids.org where children can research soils topics, play games and explore careers. Both sites feature "Ask a Scientist," which allows you to submit questions directly to soil scientists or request a scientist's classroom visit. As part of K-12 outreach, SSSA participates in the National Science Teachers Association National Conference, and partners with the National Association of Conservation Districts on materials showcasing soils themes.

Soils Matter, Get the Scoop! blog has a goal of educating the public about sustainable practices.

Soil! Get the Inside Scoop book for grades 3–5. The book explores how soil is part of our life – the food we eat, the air we breathe, the water we drink, the houses we live in, and more. Over 3000 have been sold and the book is in its second printing.

== Notable members ==
- William Albrecht, SSSA President, 1939
- Johan Bouma, Fellow, 1985
- George Demas - Emil Truog Award
- Mary K. Firestone, Fellow (1995), Don and Betty Kirkham Soil Physics Award
- Paul Goldberg
- Majid Hassanizadeh - Don and Betty Kirkham Soil Physics Award, 2011
- Hans Jenny, SSSA President, 1949, Fellow (1945)
- Dennis Keeney, SSSA President, 1988
- Rajiv Khosla, Fellow
- Rattan Lal - SSSA President, 2007, and World Food Prize-2020
- Hui-Hai Liu - Emil Truog Award
- Gerald A. Miller
- John Mortvedt, SSSA President, 1989
- Abdul Rashid
- William H. Schlesinger
- Kate Scow, Fellow
- Leslie Denis Swindale
- Emil Truog, SSSA President, 1954
- Jasper A. Vrugt - Early Career Award in Soil Physics
- Betty Klepper
