= Lito Arocena =

Filipino-born soil scientist (1959–2015)

Joselito "Lito" Modancia Arocena (born March 5, 1959 – December 20, 2015) was a Filipino-born soil scientist.

== Biography ==
Joselito Arocena immigrated to Canada from the Philippines as a student. He had a master's degree from the University of the Philippines (1985), a licentiate in soil science from the State University of Ghent (1987), and a doctorate in soil genesis and classification from the University of Alberta (1991).

Arocena published in the areas of soil genesis, mineralogy, chemistry, biology and their applications and/or relevance to soil classification, nutrient cycling in forestry and agriculture, ecology, environmental remediation, geomorphology and archaeology, covering almost all fields of soil science.

"..."Soil is life." Dr. Joselito (Lito) M. Arocena.

In 1994, Arocena began his professorship at the Environmental Science and Engineering program of the University of Northern British Columbia, where he was a founding member. In 2001, he became its first Canada Research Chair. He was also one of 10 faculty who founded the Natural Resources & Environmental Studies Institute (NRESi).

"Soil is a living system. To all of us, she is the source of food, clothing and shelter; the site of our recreational activities and to some extent spiritual belief. Soil is a habitat for many organisms and source of water and essential elements for the plants. History tells us that loss of productive soils accompanies displacement if not extinction of civilization. Soil is fundamental to life; treat it with respect and conserve it." Dr. Joselito (Lito) M. Arocena.

He died on December 20, 2015, following a diagnosis with cancer.

Posthumously, he was given the 2015 lifetime achievement award by the NRESi at UNBC. In honor of his memory, a fund was established in his name to support three UNBC students: an undergraduate scholarship, undergraduate thesis prize and a graduate thesis award.

== Selected publications ==
=== Books authored ===
- Land Degradation and Rehabilitation: Dryland Ecosystems. Advances in Geoecology, Volume 40. (ed.) ISBN 978-3-510-65378-2 (2009)
