= Johanna Döbereiner =

Brazilian agronomist (1924–2000)

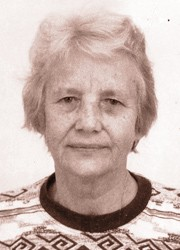
- Born: Johanna Liesbeth Kubelka; 28 November 1924; Ústí nad Labem, Czechoslovakia
- Died: 5 October 2000 (aged 75); Seropédica, Brazil
- Education: Ludwig-Maximilians-Universität München (LMU)
- Spouse: Jürgen Döbereiner
- Parent: Paul Kubelka (father)
- Awards: UNESCO Science Prize (1989); Brazilian Order of Scientific Merit; Premio México de Ciencia y Tecnología (1992)

Johanna Liesbeth Kubelka Döbereiner (28 November 1924 – 5 October 2000) was a Brazilian agronomist and pioneer in soil biology.

== Biography ==
Döbereiner was born in Ústí nad Labem in Czechoslovakia (now in the Czech Republic) on 28 November 1924. Her family were German Czechs. Her father was Professor Paul Kubelka and her mother Margarethe Kubelka. Her name Döbereiner came from her husband Jürgen Döbereiner, whom she met in Munich. Interestingly, her name became similar to the famous chemist Johann Wolfgang Döbereiner, who was born in Hof, Bavaria, in the border with Bohemia.

Johanna Döbereiner received her degree from the Ludwig-Maximilians-Universität München (LMU), but settled in Brazil and became a Brazilian citizen in 1956. Her early work includes studies of Azospirillum and other bacteria that could be useful to Brazilian soil. She later played an important role in Brazil's soybean production by encouraging a reliance on varieties that solely depended on biological nitrogen fixation.

As a consequence of her research and ideas, numerous soybean plantations in Brazil are now completely supplied for nitrogen (N) by rhizobia and not using any N-fertilizers. This movement has had big benefits, because Brazil, together with the U.S., are the main producers of soybean in the world (ca. 50% world production). Considering that soybeans are one of the most important global sources of protein (mainly fed to animals that in turn becomes animal protein for human consumption), this implies that significant amount of global protein comes from an ecological biological process without the use of industrial chemical fertilizers.

This was one of the reasons that Johanna Döbereiner was indicated for the Nobel Prize in the 1990s.

The Johanna Döbereiner Biological Resources Center was named in her honour in 2017.

== See also ==
- Timeline of women in science
- Ana Maria Primavesi
