= Crop Science Society of America =

U.S. scientific and professional society of plant biologists and crop scientists

- Abbreviation: CSSA
- Formation: 1956; 70 years ago
- Type: Scientific Society
- Headquarters: Madison, Wisconsin
- Location: United States
- Fields: Crop science
- Members: 4000+
- President: Felix Fritschi (2026)
- Affiliations: Alliance of Crop, Soil, and Environmental Science Societies (ACSESS)
- Website: www.crops.org

The Crop Science Society of America (CSSA) is a scientific and professional society of plant biologists and crop scientists based in the United States.

== About ==
The Crop Science Society of America was founded in 1956 as a daughter society of the American Society of Agronomy with its inaugural president being Gerald Mott and in 1961 launched Crop Science, the society's flagship peer-reviewed journal. More recently the society has launched two open access journals: The Plant Genome which was originally organized as a supplement to Crop Science in 2005 by Randy Shoemaker and in 2008 became an independent journal and The Plant Phenome Journal which was launched in 2017.

The Crop Science Society of America awards a number of recognitions classified as "prestigious" by the National Academies of Sciences, Engineering, and Medicine. These include the Frank N. Meyer Medal for Plant Genetic Resources, the Fred V. Grau Turfgrass Science Award, the Young Crop Scientist Award, and CSSA Fellow. No more than 0.3% of the total membership are voted the title of Fellow.

== Notable presidents ==
The following notable scientists served as President of the Society on the year listed:

- Jack Harlan, 1966
- Martin Massengale, 1973
- William L. Brown, 1982
- James B. Beard, 1986
- Donald N. Duvick, 1987
- Betty Klepper, 1997
- Ronald L. Phillips, 2000
