= Emil Truog =

American soil scientist

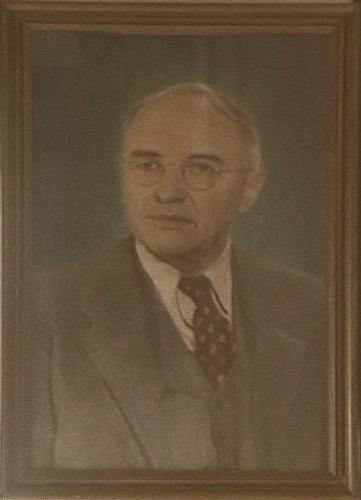
- Portrait in the collection of the Department of Soil Science, University of Wisconsin–Madison
- Born: March 6, 1884; Independence, Wisconsin
- Died: December 19, 1969 (aged 85); Madison, Wisconsin
- Known for: Emil Truog Soil Test
- Scientific career
- Fields: Soil Scientist
- Workplaces: University of Wisconsin–Madison

Emil Truog (March 6, 1884 – December 19, 1969) was an American soil scientist. He received his B.S. degree (agriculture), University of Wisconsin, 1909 and his M.S. (chemistry) in 1912. It was in 1912 when he became an instructor in soil science at the University of Wisconsin-Madison, an assistant professor in 1916, associate professor in 1917, professor in 1921 and emeritus professor in 1954. He was a chairman for the Department of Soil Science at the University of Wisconsin-Madison from 1939–1953. Much of his research during his early years at the University of Wisconsin-Madison was focused on discovering the processes by which plants obtain nutrients from the soil. With the help from his colleagues and graduate students, he pioneered many practical soil tests. His research culminated into over 100 scientific papers, three books and around 50 popular articles. Along with his work with soil and plants, he teamed up with George J. Barker, a professor of mining and metallurgy, to develop a treatment of clay in brick manufacture that cut production costs and improved quality. Emil was a very well known and admired teacher of graduate, undergraduate and short course students. During his career he guided over 100 students to their doctorate degree and almost as many to their masters. Truog was known to be an inspiring worker, leader of strong character and a person of deep concern for family and friends. He served as 1954 president of the Soil Science Society of America.

== Life ==
=== Early life and education ===
Emil Truog was born on March 6, 1884. He grew up on a farm near Independence, Wisconsin. He was the youngest of ten children. His parents were Swiss immigrants who came to America in 1850. His father started as a carpenter, working in cities along the Mississippi River. After not being able to find a suitable farm in Iowa, he settled on one near Arcadia, Wisconsin. His father served in the Civil War and shortly after married and began his wheat farm in Arcadia. His father traveled to Colorado for a few years to learn how to run an irrigated farm and returned in 1884 when Emil was born. It was common at the time for children living on a farm to go to school for 6 months and spend the other 6 working for their family. Emil began his schooling at a one room school house a mile form his house. His first teacher was Eva May Reid, who he later owed much of his success to. She gave him much encouragement and inspiration throughout his career. At the age of 14, Emil began his high school education at Independence High School (Wisconsin). It was in a physics class that he first began to see how science could be used to help with everyday work on the farm. Independence High School (Wisconsin) only offered two years of high school education and, at the encouragement of his physics teacher, he enrolled in Arcadia High School. They offered a full four-year program and he graduated from there in 1904 as the valedictorian of a class of nine boys. Emil took a year off of schooling, after his graduation, to work on the farm. The following fall he enrolled in the Agriculture program at the University of Wisconsin-Madison. His main focus while attending UW-Madison stemmed from his father. His father liked new land and told young Emil that, “On new land I never failed” but the land failed after a time and that set Emil thinking. “It made an impression on me and I wondered what’s happening to the land. What happens when new land is no longer productive” He received his B.S. Degree (Agriculture), University of Wisconsin, 1909 and his M.S. (Chemistry) in 1912.

=== Professional life at University of Wisconsin-Madison ===
Emil joined the Soil Science department in 1909 and named a professor of the department in 1921. He was The Soil Science department chairman from 1939-1953. In 1954 he was granted emeritus professor status. Through his teaching career he guided nearly 100 students to doctorate degrees and another 80 to master's degrees. Truog believed that enthusiasm springs from seeing opportunities. He had the facility for inspiring this vision in many of his students.

=== Death ===
Emil Truog died on December 19, 1969, in a Madison, Wisconsin, nursing home. He had suffered from a long illness prior. He had a wife, Lucy Truog, who succeeded him in death five months later. His surviving family members at the time were daughter, Nancy; twins, John and Martha; and six grandchildren.

== Work as a soil scientist ==
=== Hellige-Truog pH Test ===
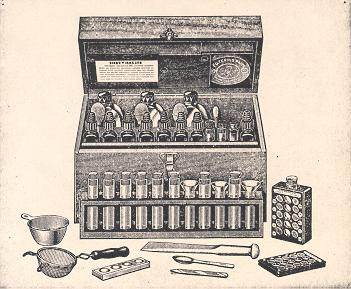
Helige-Truog pH Testing Field Kit

Long before Truog began his career as a professor and soil scientist at the University of Wisconsin-Madison, it was known that some soils were not as productive as others due to their pH level. The pH level affected the amount of available nutrients in the soil for the plant to utilize. The soil acidity could be corrected with the application of lime. The problem, at the time, was that farmers did not know how acidic their soils were, as well as not knowing how much lime to add to correct the problem. A main goal of Truog's was to develop an easy and practical test that all farmers could use to amend their soils. This was very important to Truog because not only was his family farm on acidic soils, but over 60% of Wisconsin farms at the time were on acidic soils.

In 1912 he developed the test which is the basis for the acidity tests still in use today. In its simplest form, soil, water, and chemicals were placed in a flask and brought to a boil. A piece of paper that had been soaked in lead acetate was placed over the steam that came from the flask. The paper darkened according to the degree of acid in the soil. “Probably no other person in out country has done more for the man on the land than Emil Truog”-George D. Scarseth, director of research for the American Farm research association in 1949 said. Once the piece of paper darkened they compared it to paper of already known acidic levels. Soil scientists from foreign lands and all of the U.S. began arriving in Madison to learn how they could restore their fields. Due to the widespread popularity of the test in Wisconsin at the time, Wisconsin used much more lime and fertilizer than other states. In 1946 Wisconsin used 315,000 tons of lime compared with 200,000 tons and 170,000 tons for Iowa and Minnesota.

=== Nutrient testing and the Pacemaker Corn Club ===
In the late 1930s Truog worked on a test to determine the amount of nitrogen in the soil which would become available in a season to plant life. At the time this question was mostly academic. However, the farmers were putting more thought into what was in the soil and how the plants interacted with it. Emil talked with Emil Jorgensen in the University of Wisconsin-Madison extension division and got excited. They started a campaign to help farmers get up to 100 bushels per acre, called it “One hundred bushel corn adventure” in 1952. At this time Truog had perfected his 10-year-old nitrogen availability test. Truogs test more closely approximates the interaction of the bacteria and nitrogen throughout the growing season. The test was quite simple and calls for minimum equipment. A lab worker measures a quarter teaspoon of soil to be tested into a boiling flask. Permanganate and sodium carbonate is boiled. The mixture is boiled and the chemicals liberate a portion of the nitrogen. The tube of soil and chemicals can be compared to color of tubes with known concentration to determine the amount of nitrogen availability. He figured that the farmers needed around 150 pounds of nitrogen to produce 100 bushels of corn.

Using this test, and the "100 Bushel Corn Adventure" campaign Emil tested 162 farmers soils and wrote prescriptions for the addition of nitrogen to each of them. Other suggestions were made to farmers including additions of phosphorus and potassium. Due to the farmers large success the name was changed from the, "One Hundred Bushel Corn Adventure" to, "Pacemaker Corn Club." Despite the fact that the forecast for corn in the country in 1952 was 39.4, the Wisconsin average was 58.5 bushels. The average of the 162 farms was 124 bushels, over 3 times the national average.

At the time this test was relevant, but it would later be found out that this test was not accurate. Plant-available forms of nitrogen are nitrate (NO_{3}-N) and ammonium (NH_{4}). Soil concentrations of NO_{3} and NH_{4} depend on biological activity, and therefore fluctuate with changes in conditions such as temperature and moisture. However, Truog was ahead of his time with giving the farmers, "Prescriptions" on how much nitrogen, phosophorus and potassium to add to the soils. Due to the increased nutrient levels and perfect acidity level in the soils of the farmers participating with Truog, they were able to obtain a higher than average bushel of corn per acre.

== Awards and accomplishments ==
- Honored as a 50 Year member of American Chemical Society
- Chairman of the UW-Madison Soil Science department from 1939-1953
- Guided nearly 100 Students to Doctarate Degrees and another 80 to Masters
- Published three books and over 100 Publications
- Developed the first practical soil test for acidity
- One of three Americans at the time to become an honorary member of the International Society of Soil Science
- Served on the UW athletic board

== Emil Truog Soil Science Award ==
The Emil Truog Award is designed to recognize a recent Ph.D. degree recipient who has made an outstanding contribution to soil science as evidenced by his/her Ph.D. thesis or dissertation. This award is supported through funds from the Emil Truog estate. The award consists of a certificate and $3000 honorarium.

== Research and publications ==
1. 1912- Factors Influencing the Availability of Rock Phosphate
2. 1914- A New Method for the Determination of Soil Acidity Science 40
3. 1915- A new Theory Regarding the Feeding Power of Plants Science 41
4. 1915- Soil Acidity and Methods for its detection Science 42
5. 1915- Methods for the determination of Carbon Dioxide and New Form of absorption Tower
6. 1916- Utilization of Phosphates and New Theory Regarding Feeding Power of Plants
7. 1916- A new Apparatus for Determination of Soil Carbonates and New Methods for Soil Acidity
8. 1916- Cause and Nature of Soil Acidity with Special Regard to Colloids and Absorption Jr. Am. Chem 20
9. 1917- Soil Constituents which Inhibit the Action of Plant Toxins Soil Science
10. 1918- Soil Acidity I: Its Relation to the Growth of Plants Soil Science 5:169
11. 1919- Soil Acidity II: Its Relation to the Acidity of the Plant Juice Soil Science 6:169
12. 1920- The Relation between the Calcium and Nitrogen Content of Plants Soil Science 10: 49
13. 1921- Testing Soils for Acidity Wisconsin Agriculture Experimental Station
14. 1922- The Feeding Power of Plants Science 56:294
15. 1923- Determining the Phosphorus Needs of Soils Jr. American Society of Agriculture 15:110
16. 1925- The Colloid Chemistry of Soils Third National Colloid Symposium
17. 1925- The Influence of Fertilizers in Protecting Corn Against Freezing Junior American Society of Agriculture 17: 517
18. 1928- General Exhibits Soil Science Volume 25
19. 1929-30- The pH Requirements of Cultivated Plants in Natural and Artificial Cultures American Nature-March 1930
20. 1930-31- The Determination of Ready Available Phosphorus of Soils Junior Americans Society of Agriculture
