= American Society of Agronomy =

- Abbreviation: ASA
- Formation: 1907; 119 years ago
- Type: INGO
- Purpose: to advance the field of agronomy.
- Headquarters: Madison, Wisconsin
- Services: "provides information about agronomy in relation to soils, crop production, environmental quality, ecosystem sustainability, bioremediation, waste management, recycling, and wise land use."
- Members: 8000
- Official language: English
- President: Wade Thomason (2026)
- Main organ: Agronomy Journal
- Affiliations: Alliance of Crop, Soil, and Environmental Science Societies (ACSESS)
- Website: www.agronomy.org/about-society

The American Society of Agronomy (ASA) is a scientific and professional society of agronomists and scientists of related disciplines, principally in the United States but with many non-U.S. members as well.

== About ==
It was founded December 13, 1907 with the objective of 'the increase and dissemination of knowledge concerning soils, crops, and the conditions affecting them. One of its founding members was Charles Piper, who would become its president in 1914. The first president was Mark A. Carleton and the first annual meeting was held in Washington, D.C., in 1908.

Two daughter societies were subsequently formed, the Soil Science Society of America (SSSA) and the Crop Science Society of America (CSSA). These 3 societies, the Agricultural Tri-Societies, each have their own boards of directors, their own bylaws, and their own membership rosters. The societies each minimize their expenses by sharing an office and staff (who job-share between the 3 societies), and their annual meetings are generally held together.

On April 17, 1948, the group incorporated. The ASA is headquartered in Madison, Wisconsin, and publishes a number of scientific journals, including Agronomy Journal. The ASA holds annual meetings, attended by thousands of its members.

== Presidents ==
The following members served as President of the Society on the year listed:

- Mark A. Carleton, 1908
- George Nelson Coffey, 1909
- Albert M. Ten Eyck, 1910
- Homer Jay Wheeler, 1911
- Roscoe W. Thatcher, 1912
- Louis A. Clinton, 1913
- Charles V. Piper, 1914
- Charles E. Thorne, 1915
- Carleton R. Ball, 1916
- William M. Jardine, 1917
- Thomas Lyttleton Lyon, 1918
- Jacob G. Lipman, 1919
- Franklin Stewart Harris, 1920
- Charles Ansel Mooers, 1921
- Leland E. Call, 1922
- Sidney Burritt Haskell, 1923
- Merrit F. Miller, 1924
- Clyde W. Warburton, 1925
- Carlos G. Williams, 1926
- William L. Burlison, 1927
- Arthur G. McCall, 1928
- Marion Jacob Funchess, 1929
- Walter P. Kelley, 1930
- William W. Burr, 1931
- Percy Edgar Brown, 1932
- Max Adams McCall, 1933
- Ray Iams Throckmorton, 1934
- Herbert Kendall Hayes, 1935
- Robert M. Salter, 1936
- Frederick D. Richey, 1937
- Emil Truog, 1938
- Ralph John Garber, 1939
- Frederick James Always, 1940
- Lawrence Kirk, 1941
- Richard Bradfield, 1942
- Franklin David Keim, 1943
- Frank Parker, 1944-1945
- Harold D. Hughes, 1946
- William Pierre, 1947
- Olaf Aamodt, 1948
- Firman Bear, 1949
- Laurence Graber, 1950
- Herbert P. Cooper, 1951
- David “Scotty” Robertson, 1952
- Harold Myers, 1953
- Charles Julius Willard, 1954
- George Pohlman, 1955
- Iver. J. Johnson, 1956
- Arthur G. Norman, 1957
- Will M. Myers, 1958
- John Peterson, 1959
- George F. Sprague, 1960
- Bertram Bertramson, 1961
- Glenn W. Burton, 1962
- Morell Russell, 1963
- Howard B. Sprague, 1964
- Lorenzo A. Richards, 1965
- Herbert Kramer, 1966
- Robert S.Whitney, 1967
- David Clyde Smith, 1968
- Werner Nelson, 1969
- Roy Blaser, 1970
- Charles Allen Black, 1971
- J. Ritchie Cowan, 1972
- Horace Cheney, 1973
- Darell McCloud, 1974
