= Public art in Qatar =

National museums' department

The Qatar Museums (QM) Public Art Department is responsible for overseeing the installation of artwork by renowned artists in the public realm in Qatar, creating an artist residency program for young local artists to help them develop their skills, organizing exhibitions featuring international artists and developing an online community of both local and international creative talents. The QM intends to develop Qatar into a world-class cultural destination, notably in modern and contemporary art.

Alongside the aim of increasing the number and visibility of art attractions, Qatar Museums provides material support to local artists, such as Fatma Al Sharshani, showcasing Qatar's history and culture in a bid to enhance the country's art attractions and draw tourists.

According to Sheikha Al Mayassa Bint Hamad Al Thani, Chairperson of QM: “Through displaying various forms of art in public space, we aim to inspire local talent and establish an organic connection between art and the local community.” By 2022, more than 100 public artworks were installed across Qatar.

== Public art at Hamad International Airport ==
Artwork installed at Hamad International Airport includes Untitled (Lamp/Bear) by Urs Fischer. Created out of bronze by Urs Fischer, this piece is situated in the main lobby after security. It signifies the reminder of childhood memories and intimate objects to travelers globally, inviting them to appreciate the concept of traveling the same way that Fischer travelled back in time to create it.

The Other Worlds installation by well-known American sculptor Tom Otterness consists of eight bronze sculptures located in Terminal C of the airport and is part of Otterness's Playground series. The installation functions as an artistic artwork as well as a playground by incorporating slides into the sculptures and allowing children to climb and explore them.

Tom Claassen, a Dutch artist, produced a series of Arabian oryx sculpture pieces in bronze. These are currently situated in the airport's East Arrival Hall, while Claassen's "Falcon" sculpture is located outside the departures hall.

Adel Abdessemed created Mappes Monde, featuring two global maps modeled from tin cans.

Untitled by Rudolf Stingel is in the Arrivals Meet and Greet Hall. The piece is made up of three surfaces covered with reflective aluminum panels. Before the opening of the airport, the artist asked members of the construction team to draw on these surfaces. Later, the artist cast them in copper and coated them with gold.

Ahmed Al Bahrani created A Message of Peace to the World, located in the Passenger Train's South Node station. The 1.5 metres (4 ft 11 in) bronze cube was inspired by the work of Reach Out to Asia, a non-profit organization in Qatar that supports primary and secondary education in underprivileged Asian countries.

Flying Man by the Iraqi artist Dia Al-Azzawi is located in the Arrivals Meet and Greet Hall. It consists of two sculptures inspired by ancient Mesopotamian pillars and the story of Abu Firnas, one of the first Muslims to test out flying.

Small Lie by the American artist Kaws, in the North node of the Airport resembles a wooden marionette. It is 32 feet (9.8 m) tall, made of Afrormosia wood and weighs 15 tons. The intention is to make the person standing in front of it feel small.

The French artist Jean-Michel Othoniel created Cosmos, which stands in the North node of the airport. The sculpture is inspired by the world's oldest Islamic astrolabe, an artefact in Qatar's Museum of Islamic Art, symbolizing the different paths that passengers take around the world.

Arctic Nurseries of El Dorado by the British artist Marc Quinn, is located in the departures hall before passport control. The artist combined his interest in flowers, specifically the orchid, with his interest in genetic manipulation and DNA. It is made of painted bronze. In June 2025, a collection of seven interactive bronze wildlife sculptures by Gillie and Marc called "Wildlife Wonderscapes" was installed at the airport.

=== Capture the Essence of Qatar ===
"Capture the Essence of Qatar" was a juried photography competition by Qatar Museums and Hamad International Airport allowing participants to showcase their very best creative and imaginative images of Qatar in digital photography.

The competition celebrates the achievements of Qatar, past and present, and the passion of the people who live and work there. It aims to represent the country's heritage, culture and the Qatar National Vision 2030. Four winners were selected and their work projects on large screens in the Departure Hall.

=== Local Qatari artists ===
The artwork of a number of local artists has been selected by the Qatar Museums for display in lounges and public spaces around the airport:

- Dialogue with self 1, Amal Al Aathem
- Relaxations, Salman Al Malik
- Steps, Salman Al Malik
- Reflection of a Man, Amal Al Rabban
- Heart 1, Mubarak Al Malik
- Heart 2, Mubarak Al Malik
- Calligraphy 1, Hessa Kalla
- Depth 1, Ahmed Al Hamar
- Depth 2, Ahmed Al Hamar
- Heritage 2, Wadha Al Sulaiti
- Heritage 3, Wadha Al Sulaiti
- Shift to Light I, Yousef Ahmad
- Shift to Light II, Yousef Ahmad
- Shift to Light III, Yousef Ahmad

== Public Art outside of Doha ==
=== East-West/West-East by Richard Serra ===
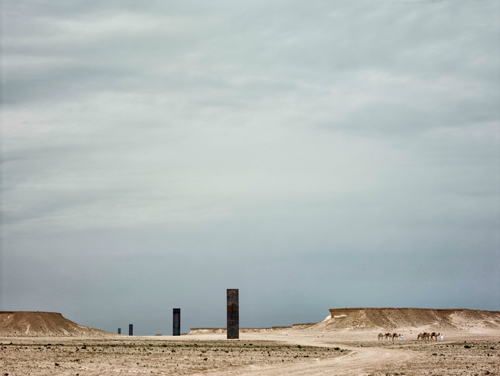
Richard Serra installation in Qatar titled East-West/West-East

Qatar Museums unveiled a major landscape commission, East-West/West-East, by American artist Richard Serra in the Zekreet Peninsula in western Qatar, approximately 60 kilometres (37 mi) from the capital Doha.

Set in a natural corridor formed by gypsum plateaus, East-West/West-East spans over a kilometre in length, and crosses the peninsula of the Brouq Nature Reserve connecting the waters of the Gulf. East-West/West-East consists of four steel plates measured by their relation to the topography. The plates, which rise to 14.7 metres (48 ft) and 16.7 metres (55 ft) above the ground, are level to each other; they are also level to the gypsum plateaus on either side. Despite the great distance that the plates span, all four can be seen and explored from either end of the sculpture.

=== Shadows Travelling on the Sea of the Day by Olafur Eliasson ===
Made of steel, fiberglass and mirrors, the large circular artworks are located in the desert and can be seen from afar. When up close and walking under the display, the mirrors reflect the sand, so by looking up viewers can see the ground. Olafur Eliasson, an Icelandic-Danish artist, created the twenty circular shelters to allow visitors to perceive the world from a different angle.

=== Maqam I, Maqam II, Maqam III by Simone Fattal ===
Simone Fattal's Maqam I, Maqam II and Maqam III are three granite sculptures located near the archaeological site of Al Zubarah. Designed to resemble both dunes and tents to depict the history and landscape of Qatar, the blue granite sticks out from the natural pink environment around it.

=== Slug Turtle, TemplEarth by Ernesto Neto ===
Brazil's Ernesto Neto created the Slug Turtle, TemplEarth to pay tribute to the natural environment and create space in which visitors can reflect, connect with the spirit of the desert as well as meditate. The structure is made out of 8 football goal frames placed in an octagonal ring covered by a crocheted white netting, with a ceramic globe structure in the middle of it.

=== Dugong Family by Ahmed Al Bahrani ===
Iraqi sculptor Ahmend Al Bahrani, inspired by the fact that Qatar has the second largest population of dugongs after Australia, created the Dugong Family sculpture. The sculpture, which consists of a family of six dugongs that appear to be floating on the sand, is located on Al Ruwais beach.

== Public Art in the MIA Park ==
=== 7 by Richard Serra ===
The sculpture is very popular to viewers around the world and has made appearances in several cities such as London, Paris, Geneva, Buenos Aires and St Petersburg. Commissioned by the QM, Richard Serra's landmark 7, an 80 feet (24 m) steel sculpture, is the tallest public art piece in Qatar and the tallest Richard Serra has ever conceived. As a focal point of MIA Park, the sculpture is also Serra's first sculpture to be showcased in the Middle East. Constructed from seven steel plates arranged in a heptagonal shape, the work celebrates the scientific and spiritual significance of the number seven in Islamic culture.

=== Us, Her, Him by Najla El Zein ===
French Lebanese artist Najla El Zein sculpted Us, Her, Him which are located around the Flag Plaza. The 313-meter (1,027 ft) spanning limestone benches are sculpted to reflect upon human interactions and place importance on human connection.

=== Bench by Saloua Raouda Choucair ===
Saloua Raouda Choucair (1916-2017) was a Lebanese artist who created the Bench at the waterfront in MIA Park. The work consists of a half circle made up of seventeen limestone pieces.

=== Folded Extracted Personified by Liam Gillick ===
Made up of ten irregularly shaped panel structures which fold and zigzag together, Folded Extracted Personified by Liam Gillick is located at the Museum of Islamic Art (MIA) Park. It is an interactive display, which combines sculptures and playground features. The large 2.4-meter-high (7.9 ft) panels have random circular cut outs in which visitors can peer through.

=== Further artworks at MIA Park ===
In April 2025, Qatar Museums unveiled Nairy Baghramian's sculptural installation "Privileged Points" at MIA Park. In November 2025, Qatar Museums presented Peter Fischli and David Weiss's "Rock on Top of Another Rock", formed from two granite boulders balanced on top of each other.

== Public Art at the Doha Corniche and Al Bidda Park ==
The Doha Corniche is a 4.3 miles (6.9 km) long waterfront promenade at the coast of Doha located near the Museum of Islamic Art, while the Al Bidda Park overlooks the Doha Corniche.

=== Acacia-Tree Seed by Mohammed Al-Ateeq ===
Mohammed Al-Ateeq's Acacia Tree Seed is a sculpture located within the Post Office Park and is a representation of human nature, both good and bad. Al-Ateeq is a Qatari artist and was Chairman of the Qatar Fine Arts Association from 2006 until 2013, until 2017 he held the position as Regency Art General Manager there.

=== Doha Mountains by Ugo Rondinone ===
Located near the 974 Stadium at the Ras Abou Aboud beachfront, the Doha Mountains are made up of vertically stacked rocks that are painted in colors representing the Olympic rings. Inspired by natural Hoodoos and the art of meditative rock stacking, they represent a combination of geological formations and abstract compositions.

=== Milestones by Shua'a Ali ===
Milestones is a representation of the transformation that occurred over the past five decades to the Qatar financial systems and is made up of three elements. The 2 ropes around one stone relate to the 2 month dive, the 4 ropes around another to the 40 day dive, while the golden stone stands for wealth and prosperity. Ali emphasizes the meaning and significance of Qatar's financial state throughout the years through the use of raw materials. Her style of art is similar throughout her work in Public art, similarly to Tawazun she uses materials you can find in both urban and rural areas which makes her art style unique in comparison to many others.

=== Clay Court by Faye Toogood ===
Made up of 17 large hand-shaped clay sculptures, Clay Court is located near the Qatar National Theater. Each sculpture is made specifically for its location and is designed to represent seats, benches and arches.

=== Al Jassasiya 2022 by Salman Al-Malek ===
Al Jassasiva 2022 is a sculpture inspired by the petroglyphs at the Al Jassasiya Rock Art Site and depicts a boat with paddles of various sizes that are abstractly connected. The Al Jassasiya Rock Art Site is an archaeology site located at an old sea port containing over 900 petroglyphs, the majority having been created about 250 years ago by fishermen of the area.

=== The Doha Modern Playground by Shezad Dawood ===
Replicating important buildings built in Qatar between 1962 and 1987, the modern playgrounds six structures invite visitors to reflect in a playful way. Located at the Al Masrah Park, Shezad Dawood's creation, that was created with help from local architect Fatma Al Sehlawi, opened to the public in October 2022.

=== Gekröse by Franz West ===
Gekröse (2011) is a bright pink welded aluminum sculpture situated in Doha Corniche. It was designed by the late Austrian artist Frank West to resemble human intestines as its title refers too. The sculpture is the largest of West's artworks and can be interpreted by viewers in a variety of ways.

=== Dugong by Jeff Koons ===
Towering at more than 22 metres (72 ft) in height and 30 metres (98 ft) long, the giant inflatable Dugong by Jeff Koons was located at the Corniche in Al Masrah Park from November 2022 until June 2024. The inflatable shiny endangered marine mammal is to symbolize the importance of protecting the wildlife in Qatar.

=== A Blessing in Disguise by Ghada Al Khater ===
A Blessing in Disguise by Ghada Al Khater was created in 2018 as a response in Arabic to Martin Creed's Everything is Going to be Alright. The curving Arabic letters are lit up on the facade of the Fire Station, and it was designed for the anniversary of the blockade against Qatar.

=== The Greatest Goal by Lorenzo Quinn ===
In December 2022, Lorenzo Quinn's recycled-steel football-goal sculpture "The Greatest Goal", which has the Guinness World Records entry as the largest sculpture made from recycled steel, was presented at Al Bidda Park.

=== Toub Toub Ya Bahar by Salman Al-Malek ===
Salman Al-Malek's 2022 "Toub Toub Ya Bahar" installation at the Corniche waterfront draws its title and subject from a traditional song sung by women awaiting sailors and pearl divers.

== Public Art at the West Bay of Doha ==
=== Gandhi's Three Monkeys by Subodh Gupta ===
Three sculptures by Indian artist Subodh Gupta, Gandhi's Three Monkeys were installed at Katara Cultural Village. As homage to India's famous leader of peace, Mahatma Gandhi, Gupta uses steel and worn brass domestic utensils to form a soldier, a terrorist and a man wearing a gas mask to represent Gandhi's three monkeys “See no evil, Hear no evil, Speak no evil”.

=== Zephyr by Monira Al Qadiri ===
Located along the West Bay's North Beach is Monira Al Qadiri's Zephyr. The plexiglass reproductions of Arabian Peninsula fossilized marine algae light up along the beach walkway to remind viewers of the importance of the well-being of the ocean and its ecological state.

=== 1361 by Martin Creed ===
The Artwork 1361 by British artist Martin Creed consist of the phrase "Everything is Going to be Alright" written with bright lights mounted on the wall of the Sheraton Grand hotel. The installation followed the one-year anniversary of the blockade of Qatar.

=== Hahn by Katharina Fritsch ===
Hahn is a 4.72-meter-tall (15.5 ft) blue sculpture of a rooster which was created by German artist Katharina Fritsch. The sculpture is located at the outside the Shereton Hotel in Doha and is made of steel and polyester resin.

=== Here We Hear by Suki Seokyeong Kang ===
Made of steel, marble, and various sculptures that each provide shelter and open space is Here We Hear created by Korean artists Suki Seokyeong Kang. She combines traditions with contemporary art and literary discourses to allow visitors to use the space of the sculpture to share their own stories with one another.

=== Smoke by Tony Smith ===
American artist Tony Smith (died 1980) created the original wooden Smoke sculpture in 1967, which is located at the Los Angeles County Museum of Art (LACMA). A replica of the sculpture was created in 2010 and placed at the Doha Convention and Exhibition Centre. The aluminium sculpture is made up of 5 tetrahedrons and 45 extended octahedrons which stands more than 7 metres (23 ft) in height over two tiers.

=== Never Give Up by Georgie Poulariani ===
Georgian artist Georgie Poulariani's sculpture "Never Give Up" depicting a "delicate butterfly breaking free" was unveiled at Katara Cultural Village in January 2025 as a work centred on resilience and cultural diversity.

=== King Time by Emilio Medeiros ===
In December 2025, Emilio Medeiros's three-metre (9.8 ft) aluminium sculpture "King Time", commemorating Uruguay's bicentenary and relations between Uruguay and Qatar, was unveiled in Katara Cultural Village.

== Public Art at the Qatar University and in Lusail ==
=== Buscando la luz IV by Eduardo Chillida ===
Qatar Museums unveils Public Art commission by the Basque artist Eduardo Chillida at Qatar University, Doha, Qatar. Buscando la luz IV (Searching for Light IV) is the last among a series of sculptures of monumental scale produced by Chillida throughout his final creative period. The abstract piece integrates in itself the fundamental concepts inside the artist's labor. The dialogue between matter and space; the creation of sites; the organic nature of forms; and a strong ethical content are all notions that conform Chillida's body of work. The three asymmetrical steel plates that compose the sculpture are linked to each other through a complex riveting system, which delimitates in its interior a place for human encounters. The artist plays with the scale and invites us to enter the interior space of the work. Once inside, its undulant forms appear to acquire movement, raising up in search of the light.

=== Memory of the Arches by Saloua Raouda Choucair ===
Late Saloua Raouda Choucair's Memory of the Arches sculpture is a Moroccan inspired architectural form of arches and doorways. Located in Lusail Boulevard, viewers are given the opportunity to self reflect while taking in the various elements of the Bronze sculpture that sits in a shallow pool of water.

=== Egal by Shouq Al Mana ===
Influences by identity Local Qatari artist Shouq Al Mana created Egal which is a representation of the traditional headwear that Qatari men wore as far back as the Babylonian period. It is located in Lusail, and is made up of 5 sculptures at various heights depicting the double black cord used to wrap around the Qatari male white scarf headdress. Egal's are often worn on top of the Ghitra's for men, this headwear is traditional across the Gulf and highly indicative of Qatari cultural background. The sculptures are meant to be symbolic of the Qatari unity during the blockades that started in 2017. Every sculpture of the Egal is a different height which symbolizes the different generations who have experiences the hardships of the 2017 blockade.

=== Shelters by Marco Bruno & Michael Perrone ===
Situated in Lusail, Shelters is made up of two structures that can be used as a resting or meeting area for those that are playing street cricket. The design is influenced by the Qatar cricket community. The entire structure can be dismantled and set up in a different location if desired since it is made up of metal pipe scaffolding covered with a synthetic mesh.

=== The Challenge by Ahmed Al Bahrani ===
The Challenge 2015 by Ahmed Al Bahrani was commissioned by the Lusail Multipurpose Hall in celebration with Qatar hosting the men’s Handball World Championships. The sculpture consist of two bronze hands coming out of the ground, with one of them holding a handball.

=== Painted Walls by Mohammed Al Nasif ===
The two murals called Painted Walls made by Mohammed Al Nasif are located in the Lusail Multipurpose Hall and were part of the displays commissioned for the Handball World Championships held in Qatar. They depict elements of Qatari culture and the development and progress of the country.

=== Keys to Memories ===
In April 2025, "Keys to Memories", an installation made from 250,000 keychains collected after the 2022 World Cup by Boo Design Studio and Maryam Al-Homaid, was installed outside the Lusail Metro Station.

== Public Art at the Education City of Doha ==
=== Maman by Louise Bourgeois ===
Maman, a 30 feet (9.1 m)-tall bronze-cast spider sculpture located at the Qatar National Convention Center of Qatar Foundation, is an ode from renowned French-American artist Louise Bourgeois to her mother, who worked as a weaver in France.

=== The Miraculous Journey by Damien Hirst ===
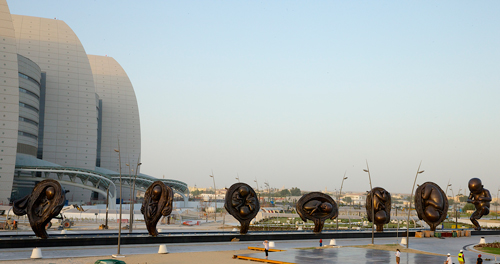
Damien Hirst's The Miraculous Journey

The Miraculous Journey (2005–2013) by British Artist Damien Hirst consists of 14 gigantic bronze sculptures that chart the gestation of a human being from conception to birth, ending with a statue of a 46 feet (14 m)-tall anatomically correct baby boy. The installation is located in front of the Sidra Medical and Research Center, a new academic medical facility specialising in patient care for women and children in Qatar. The figures range in height from 4.8 metres (16 ft) to 10.7 metres (35 ft), and weigh between 9 and 28 tonnes each.

=== Sections of the Berlin Wall ===
The German Embassy gave the State of Qatar various sections of the Berlin wall which are on display at the Qatar National Convention Centre (QNCC) and the Georgetown University in Doha. The sections were given to the Qatar Museums in 2017 during the Qatar-Germany Year of Culture 2017. The pieces at the QNCC were painted in 2007 by Thierry Noir, who also claims to have been one of the first artists to paint a part of the Berlin wall back in 1984.

=== THEY ASKED ME TO CHANGE IT AND I AGREED by Adel Abidin ===
Adel Abidin's neon light display at the Arab Museum of Modern Art reads "They asked me to change it and I agreed". The letters are on the outside wall of the museum for all visitors and passerby's to see. Abidin is a Baghdad born multidisciplinary artist whose works are a humorous take on contemporary art as a whole.

=== Come Together by Choi Jeong Hwa ===
Choi Jeong Hwa's 12-metre (39 ft) installation "Come Together" consists of orbs made from steel and plastic in bright pastel and neon colours. Commissioned by Qatar Foundation, the installation was inaugurated near the Education City Stadium in December 2022 as a tribute to workers involved in building Qatar's World Cup infrastructure.

== Public Art in Msheireb and surroundings ==
=== Two Orchids by Isa Genzken ===
Located at the Qatar National Theater, this sculpture made by German artist Isa Genzken out of steel and aluminum consists of two large orchids towering its white flowers over visitors below.

=== Spooning by Subodh Gupta ===
Indian artist Subodh Gupta's Spooning, is a larger than life recreation of two spoons in stainless steel laying on top of each other and is locate within the M7. His contemporary piece is intended to be perceived as two lovers, the way the spoons form to each other and to emit a feeling of love while looking at it.

=== Tawazun by Shua’a Ali ===
Tawazun, a sculpture made up of organic and geometric shapes made from sandstone, limestone, granite and pebbles, was created by local Qatari artist Shua’a Ali. She wanted to create an image of the Qatar’s sustainability as well as its balance of traditional and modern infrastructure and heritage. By issuing the goal that she wanted to illustrate Qatar's sustainability, she highlights the blockade era in 2017 and how Qatar has managed to breakthrough the hardships and build up a balance and stable social and economic status globally.

=== Turquoise City by Mark Handforth ===
British born sculptor Mark Handforth created Turquoise City after visiting Msheireb Downtown Doha. It is located next to the Mandarin Oriental Hotel, and is a spiral curve made out of industrial matters, that is cut and oddly stacked together displaying the unfolding start of life.

=== Pouce (Thumb) by César Baldaccini ===
Le Pouce sits on display in the Qatar city of Souq Waqif as a symbol honouring the country’s Asian Cup win in 2019. It was created by French artist César Baldaccini (1921-1998). The sculpture is a scaled up version of a cast of the artist’s own thumb that was created in 1965. The location for this piece of art was selected by Qatar Museums to serve as a landmark in the middle of the city and to showcase a blend of classic and modern design. This central location, at the top of Al Souq street and near the city’s busy food district, allows viewers to experience the scale of the sculpture compared to the size of nearby shops and cafés.

=== Rose III by Isa Genzken ===
German artist, Isa Genzken created the large scale sculpture Rose III, which is located in the atrium of M7. The 8 metres (26 ft)-tall aluminium and steel single long-stemmed rose is a reproduction of a 3D scan of a real rose.

=== Allow Me by Guillaume Rouseré ===
Sound artist Guillaume Rouseré created Allow Me by recording audio from the speech that His Highness the Emir Sheikh Tamim bin Hamad Al Thani held at the 72nd Session of the United Nations General Assembly in 2017 and then casting the soundwaves into plaster, from which he made a limestone sculpture. The sculpture is on view in the Msheireb metro station.

=== Untitled (Trench, Shafts, Pit, Tunnel and Chamber) by Bruce Nauman ===
Bruce Nauman's artwork "Untitled (Trench, Shafts, Pit, Tunnel and Chamber)" was installed outside M7 in 2021. The artwork consist of two pieces, each made up of a steel cone and a steel ring, with both pieces mirroring the other.

== Public Art at the National Museum of Qatar ==
=== I Live Under Your Sky Too by Shilpa Gupta ===
This light installation is located at the Stadium 974 and is a sentence written in Gupta's handwriting stating "I live under your sky too" in English, Arabic and Malayalam. Shilpa Gupta is a Mumbai-based artist and her works are intended to play on how people and their experiences are created by the places and objects around them.

=== On Their Way by Roch Vandromme ===
French artist Roch Vandromme created a bronze sculpture “On The Way” made up of four camels, two of which are calves, to show the importance of the animals relationship with Qatar and its nomadic lifestyle. It is located outside the National Museum of Qatar in Doha.

=== Motherland By Hassan Bin Mohammed Al Thani ===
The original sculpture was created in 2002 by Hassan bin Mohammed Al Thani, resembling a sailing dhow resting on the shore line, while the edition in the National Museum of Qatar was commissioned by Qatar Museums. The sculpture was designed to act as a symbol of appreciation for the national identity, motherhood and the land as well as pay tribute to the region’s women who wore a battoola.

=== Flag of Glory by Ahmed Al Bahrani ===
Made up of sculpted hands supporting each other and raising the Qatari flag, this sculpture by Ahmed Al Bahrani is meant to be a symbol of national strength, pride and to represent the many hands involved in making projects successful. Al Bahrani claims this piece to be one of life importance to him. The 20-meter-high (66 ft) flag rests on the over 4-meter-high (13 ft) bronzed sculpture specifically sculpted after Qatar’s National Day theme.

=== Gates to the Sea by Simone Fattal ===
Located at the entrance of the Qatar National Museum, Gates to the Sea by Simone Fattal provides visitors with a connection to the past and present, as the sculpture represents the rock carvings that are found in Qatar’s various archaeological sites, with various petroglyphs drawing attention to the nations connection to the sea.

=== Central Midkhan by Aisha Nasser Al Sowaidi ===
Located in the National Museum of Qatar, on the wall of the VIP lounge, Aisha Nasser Al Sowaidi’s Central Midkhan can be visited. The installation was made largely out of pipes and designed to spread scent in several direction at the same time. Al Sowaidi was trying to create an industrial representation of the infrastructure of a home reflecting traditions and functionality.

=== ALFA by Jean-Michel Othoniel ===
Jean- Michel Othoniel’s ALFA is made up of 114 fountain sculptures resembling reeds along the shore of the lagoon, shooting water every 30 minutes. They are located in between the Persian Gulf and the National Museum of Qatar along the entire lagoon area and are illuminated at night, highlighting the buildings architectural features.

== Other artworks in Doha ==
=== The Force of Nature II by Lorenzo Quinn ===
The Force of Nature II is part of Lorenzo Quinn’s art sculptures collection. He has a total of 4 The Force of Nature II sculptures worldwide, with one located in the Katara Cultural Village in Doha, Qatar. It is made up of bronze, stainless steel and aluminum. It was installed in Katara in October, 2011.

=== Perceval by Sarah Lucas ===
Perceval by British artist Sarah Lucas is a life-sized bronze sculpture of a Shire horse pulling a cart with two oversized squash installed at the Aspire Park in Doha. The subject matter reflects Lucas' fondness for re-examining everyday objects in unusual contexts.

=== Sports Ball Galaxy by Daniel Arsham ===
This large scale sports inspired chandelier is located inside the 3-2-1 Qatar Olympic and Sports Museum. American artist Daniel Arsham has playfully arranged ball structures on steel cables that are attached to beams bolted to the ceiling. The way in which the balls are colored is deliberately done to show Arsham's personal struggle with being color blind.

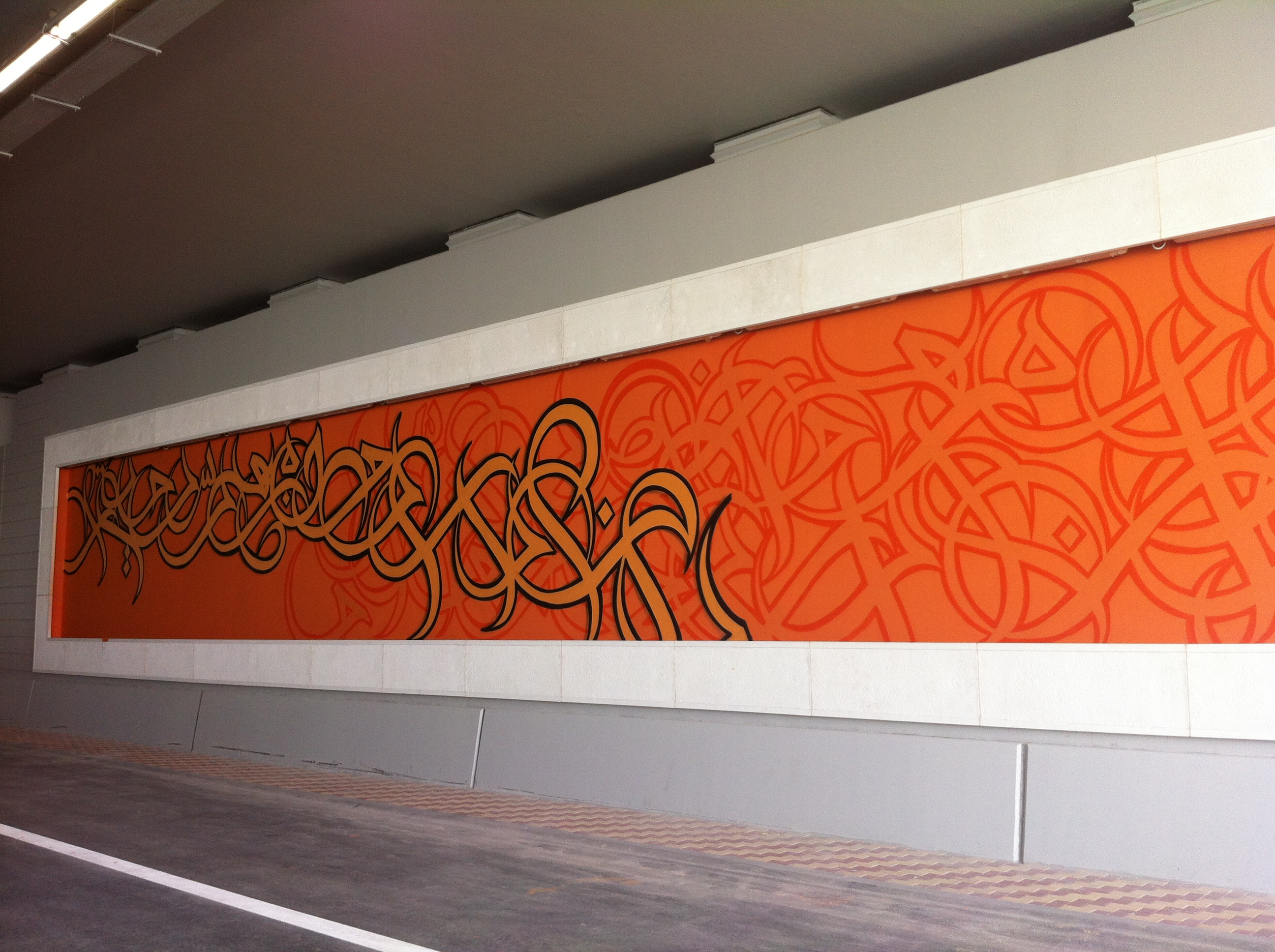
One of eL Seed's 52 murals on Salwa Road, Doha, Qatar

=== eL Seed in Doha: Calligraffiti Project ===
QM's Public Art Department and the Public Works Authority (Ashghal) commissioned French-Tunisian eL Seed to adorn four tunnels on Salwa Road with calligraffiti murals. Each of the 52 murals features unique themes inspired by anecdotes from Qatari culture and markers of Qatari life.

=== Healthy Living From The Start by Anne Geddes ===
The QM commissioned Anne Geddes to produce a series of 12 images capturing local athletes with newborn babies and young children. Located at the main hallway of the Women's Hospital affiliated with the Hamad Medical Corporation, the images are part of an initiative by QMA Chairperson to raise awareness on Diabetes 2 and the importance of engaging in sports activities at an early age.

=== Village of the Sun by Rashid Johnson ===
Rashid Johnson's "Village of the Sun", comprising four mosaic-covered walls, was installed at the Doha International Airport Park in 2024. The work was commissioned for the World Cup in 2022, but was delayed by two years.

=== Infinity Love by Bashayer Al-Badr ===
In September 2024, Bashayer Al-Badr's stainless-steel Arabic-calligraphy sculpture "Infinity Love" was installed outside the Al Shafallah Centre. The artwork was commissioned to honour Sheikha Moza's support for the centre.

=== Aspire House by Mehdi Moutashar ===
The "Aspire House" artwork in the Aspire Park aims to portray a sense of family and home trough abstract geometric forms. The artwork is a legacy project of Mehdi Moutashar's 2023 solo exhibition at the Mathaf.

=== La Menina by Antonio Azzato and Muna Al Bader ===
The "La Menina" sculpture was made by Spanish artist Antonio Azzato and afterwards painted by Qatari artist Muna Al Bader. The sculpture, located at the Old Doha Port, is inspired by Diego Veláquz's Las Meninas.
