= Criminal negligence =

Offence with breach of expected behaviour

In criminal law, criminal negligence is an offence that involves a breach of an objective standard of behaviour expected of a defendant. It may be contrasted with strictly liable offences, which do not consider states of mind in determining criminal liability, or offenses that requires mens rea, a mental state of guilt.

== Concept ==
To constitute a crime, there must be an actus reus (Latin for "guilty act") accompanied by the mens rea (see concurrence). Negligence shows the least level of culpability, intention being the most serious, and recklessness being of intermediate seriousness, overlapping with gross negligence. The distinction between recklessness and criminal negligence lies in the presence or absence of foresight as to the prohibited consequences. Recklessness is usually described as a "malfeasance" where the defendant knowingly exposes another to the risk of injury. The fault lies in being willing to run the risk. But criminal negligence is a "misfeasance" or "nonfeasance" (see omission), where the fault lies in the failure to foresee and so allow otherwise avoidable dangers to manifest. In some cases this failure can rise to the level of willful blindness, where the individual intentionally avoids adverting to the reality of a situation. (In the United States, there may sometimes be a slightly different interpretation for willful blindness.) The degree of culpability is determined by applying a reasonable-person standard. Criminal negligence becomes "gross" when the failure to foresee involves a "wanton disregard for human life" (see the definitions of corporate manslaughter and in many common law jurisdictions of gross negligence manslaughter).

The test of any mens rea element is always based on an assessment of whether the accused had foresight of the prohibited consequences and desired to cause those consequences to occur. The three types of test are:

1. subjective where the court attempts to establish what the accused was actually thinking at the time the actus reus was caused;
2. objective where the court imputes mens rea elements on the basis that a reasonable person with the same general knowledge and abilities as the accused would have had those elements; or
3. hybrid, i.e., the test is both subjective and objective.

The most culpable mens rea elements will have both foresight and desire on a subjective basis. Negligence arises when, on a subjective test, an accused has not actually foreseen the potentially adverse consequences to the planned actions, and has gone ahead, exposing a particular individual or unknown victim to the risk of suffering injury or loss. The accused is a social danger because they have endangered the safety of others in circumstances where the reasonable person would have foreseen the injury and taken preventive measures.

== Reasonable person standard ==
"Reasonable person standard" does not pertain to a real person, but rather a legal fiction. It is an objective yardstick against which to measure the culpability of real people. For these purposes, the reasonable person is not an average person: this is not a democratic measure. To determine the appropriate level of responsibility, the test of reasonableness has to be directly relevant to the activities being undertaken by the accused. What the "average person" thinks or might do would be irrelevant in a case where a doctor is accused of wrongfully killing a patient during treatment. Hence, there is a baseline of minimum competence that all are expected to meet. This reasonable person is appropriately informed, capable, aware of the law, and fair-minded. This standard can never go down, but it can go up to match the training and abilities of the particular accused. In testing whether the particular doctor has misdiagnosed a patient so incompetently that it amounts to a crime, the standard must be that of a reasonable doctor. Those who hold themselves out as having particular skills must match the level of performance expected of people with comparable skills. When engaged in an activity outside their expertise, such individuals revert to the ordinary person standard. This is not to deny that ordinary people might do something extraordinary in certain circumstances, but the ordinary person as an accused will not be at fault if they do not do that extraordinary thing so long as whatever that person does or thinks is reasonable in those circumstances.

The more contentious debate has surrounded the issue of whether the reasonable person should be subjectively matched to the accused in cases involving children, and persons with a physical or mental disability. Young and inexperienced individuals may not foresee what an adult might foresee, a blind person cannot see at all, and an autistic person may not relate to the world as a non-autistic person. Cases involving infancy and mental disorders as an insanity defense potentially invoke excuses to criminal liability because the accused lack full capacity, and criminal systems provide an overlapping set of provisions which can either deal with such individuals outside the criminal justice system, or if a criminal trial is unavoidable, mitigate the extent of liability through the sentencing system following conviction. Notwithstanding, those who have ordinary intellectual capacities are expected to act reasonably given their physical condition. Thus, a court would ask whether a blind reasonable person would have set out to do what the particular blind defendant did. People with physical disabilities rightly wish to be active members of the community but, if certain types of activity would endanger others, appropriate precautions must be put in place to ensure that the risks are reasonable.

== Examples ==
=== United States ===
Examples of criminally negligent crimes are criminally negligent homicide and negligent endangerment of a child. Usually the punishment for criminal negligence, criminal recklessness, criminal endangerment, willful blindness and other related crimes is imprisonment, unless the criminal is insane (and then in some cases the sentence is indeterminate).

=== English law ===
The leading statement to describe "criminal negligence" at common law for the purposes of establishing a test for manslaughter in the law of England and Wales, is that of Lord Hewart CJ in the case of R v Bateman:

In explaining to juries the test which they should apply to determine whether the negligence, in the particular case, amounted or did not amount to a crime, judges have used many epithets, such as "culpable", "criminal", "gross", "wicked", "clear", "complete". But, whatever epithet be used and whether an epithet be used or not, in order to establish criminal liability the facts must be such that, in the opinion of the jury, the negligence of the accused went beyond a mere matter of compensation between subjects and showed such disregard for the life and safety of others as to amount to a crime against the State and conduct deserving punishment.

For a murder, the mens rea is that of malice aforethought, a deliberate and sometimes premeditated killing. But the larger percentage of deaths result from situations where there is either no intention to injure another, or only an intention to inflict less serious injury. The need is therefore to be able to distinguish between those who happened to be present when another died accidentally or through misadventure, and those who have contributed to the death in a way that makes them criminally rather than merely morally responsible. For example, suppose that A, an expert in kayaking, organises an outing for local children who are learning the sport. They travel to a large lake but, after an hour of paddling, they are overtaken by a violent storm and some of the children drown despite all wearing life-preservers. If all the kayaks, paddles and ancillary equipment are shown to have been in good condition, the storm had not been forecast by the meteorological services, and it was reasonable for these children to undertake this type of outing given their level of skill/swimming, A will not have liability. But if many of the children were too inexperienced and/or a storm had been forecast, A might well be found liable by a jury.

=== Canada ===
The Criminal Code has a series of offences covering criminal negligence when bodily harm or death is caused. Such laws are sometimes used to prosecute cases of dangerous driving causing injury or death. The maximum penalties for criminal negligence causing bodily harm and death are 10 years (14 years if the conviction is for street racing causing bodily harm) and life imprisonment, respectively.

== See also ==
- Child neglect
- Dangerous driving
- Death by dangerous driving
- Negligence
- Negligent infliction of emotional distress
- Tombstone mentality
- Turning a blind eye
- Vehicular manslaughter
- Willful ignorance
