= United States v. Giovanetti =

- Court: United States Court of Appeals for the Seventh Circuit
- Argued: September 18, 1990
- Decided: December 5, 1990
- Citation: 919 F.2d 1223

Court membership
- Judges sitting: Richard Posner, Kenneth Francis Ripple, Daniel Anthony Manion

Case opinions
- Majority: Posner, joined by a unanimous court

United States v. Giovanetti, 919 F.2d 1223 (7th Cir. 1990), is a criminal case that interpreted the jury instruction known as the ostrich instruction, that willful ignorance counted as knowledge where required for a guilty mind (mens rea) in complicity to commit a crime. The court held that willful ignorance required a positive act to avoid knowledge, otherwise it reduces the mens rea requirement of proving "knowledge" to merely proving "negligence" (should have known).

Janis rented a house to Orlando, who Janis should have known would use the house for his illegal gambling ring. Janis was prosecuted as an accomplice to the illegal gambling. The trial court gave the ostrich defense that "you may infer knowledge from a combination of suspicion and indifference to the truth".

Judge Richard Posner wrote the court's opinion, stating:

The most powerful criticism of the ostrich instruction is, precisely, that its tendency is to allow juries to convict upon a finding of negligence [in knowing] for crimes that require intent ... The ostrich instruction is designed for cases in which there is evidence that the defendant, knowing or strongly suspecting that he is involved in shady dealings, takes steps to make sure that he does not acquire full or exact knowledge of the nature and extent of those dealings. A deliberate effort to avoid guilty knowledge is all the guilty knowledge the law requires.
