= Prapanna =

Prapanna is a sanskrit word that means complete surrender/dedication.

Raamaanuja of the Vishishtadvaita school said that a person has to be just a 'prapanna', meaning completely surrendered to God. This is called 'Prapatti'. If a person completely trusts God and surrenders himself in thought, word and deed, then he or she can attain the highest point "Vishnoh Paramam Padam".

Prapanna is mentioned many times in the Bhagavata Purana. A prapanna is expected to fulfill some or all of the five a~ngas to attain prapatti. 'Prapanna' is the one who surrenders herself/himself to God and how she/he deals with life treading a path of purity.
