= Interdepartmental Liaison Group on Risk Assessment =

Informal committee of the British government

The UK Interdepartmental Liaison Group on Risk Assessment (ILGRA) was "an informal committee of officials responsible for policy development and practical applications of risk assessment in all major Departments."

The overriding purpose of ILGRA is to "secure coherence and consistency within and between policy and practice in risk assessment as undertaken by Government, and help disseminate and advance good practice." It achieves these aims through holding regular meetings, at which risk assessment issues are discussed. Reports are then prepared by ILGRA members to ministers in the relevant UK Government departments.

ILGRA meetings and resultant reports tend to focus predominantly on health, safety and environmental risks, although its remit is not confined to this areas exclusively.

== See also ==
- Risk assessment
- Risk management
- Precautionary principle
