= Case of Munsterkerkhof =

The alleged manslaughter of 59-year-old Aletta Francina van Rooijen-Emmelot took place on the night of 31 May 1883. A group of students, members of the student society Utrechtsch Studenten Corps then located at Munsterkerkhof, nowadays Domplein, were alleged to have abused Van Rooijen-Emmelot and her husband resulting in her death six days later. Six law students were arrested after Aletta's husband claimed her death was the result of the beatings by the students six days before. The affair, or The Case of Munsterkerkhof as it became known in the local and national newspapers, brought to light the citizens' displeasure with the preferential treatment students received in judicial matters at that time, especially after the court ruling in February 1884.

== Events leading up to the alleged manslaughter ==
The rendition of the following events is based upon allegations made by Aletta's husband Jacobus Hendricus van Rooijen. On the night of 31 May 1883, Aletta Francina van Rooijen-Emmelot had been cleaning the school located at Munsterkerhof since 4 am when, around 5 am, she was startled by a tumultuous party outside the Utrechtsch Studenten Corps' society at Munsterkerkhof. Aletta looked out on the square when, after opening the door of her home, she encountered a group of drunk students. According to Aletta's husband Jacobus, the students started to beat the 59-year-old woman with sticks in the hallway without provocation. Woken by his wife's screams Jacobus hurried to Aletta's aid, only to be met by more beatings by the students and both being pulled out of the house. The students went on to break some windows and left the couple beaten and frightened. Bystanders helped the couple inside and Jacobus called for the police, who were not able to arrest the students since all but one student, who proceeded to throw something heavy at the Van Rooijen's front door, had disappeared.

The day after, two of the students offered to pay for the damaged windows and door, but refused to do so when Jacobus asked 30 guilders for the damage.

Six days later, on 6 June 1883, Aletta died. Her husband claimed her death was the result of the beatings. Jacobus proceeded to take judicial action and filed a complaint at the Utrecht Court.

== The trial ==
=== Alleged victims ===
Aletta Francina van Rooijen-Emmelot and Jacobus Hendricus van Rooijen were both born in Utrecht respectively in 1824 and 1823. Aletta and Jacobus were married 18 July in 1849. While no occupation was written down on Aletta's death certificate she cleaned the Marnixschool at Munsterkerkhof where her husband was occupied as the school's custodian. Jacobus died fourteen years after his wife's death on 10 March 1897 in his home on Abstederdijk Utrecht.

=== Alleged suspects ===
All of the alleged six suspects were law students and members of the student society.

J.E. Boddaert born in Middelburg 22 years old

J.K.H.Turk from Amersfoort, 22 years old

Jhr J.A.P.L. Ram, born in Utrecht 23 years old

W. Grenfell, born in Hattem, 24 years old

H.J.CJ. de Jong, from Utrecht 24 years old

Jhr A.J. van Rijckevorsel van Kessel born in 's-Hertogenbosch 24 years old.

=== Trial and sentencing ===
The trial started 28 January 1884 in Utrecht and lasted two days. The court investigation showed that the suspected students had indeed been very loud and rowdy that night.

The defense did not deny this but claimed Jacobus could have made more of an effort to be polite to the students that night. The advocates of the students claimed that the students were drunk and therefore cheerful and did not intend any harm. J.E. Boddaert, one of the suspected students, had pointed to Jacobus' bare feet with his stick and said he had better wash his filthy paws after Jacobus had urged the students to leave his hallway. Boddaert testified this resulted in some tugging and pulling at sticks in the hallway where no one was intentionally harmed, and no one actually witnessed the alleged beating.

The defense suggested if only Jacobus had not loudly accosted the students, demanding them to leave his hallway, nothing would have happened. Furthermore the advocates of the students wondered why Aletta, a longtime resident of the Munsterkerkhof, had been so reckless and stupid to open the door to check students' uproar. The defense insisted that the students were outstanding properly educated young men from good families who did not deserve any punishment, since the witness statements contradicted each other.

An expert witness attested that Aletta had been a sickly woman, suffering from kidney disease and abnormalities of the heart and aorta. The whole unruly affair would not have been helpful for Aletta's health, but making it the main cause of her death would have been a stretch, so the court and defense claimed. Furthermore the expert witness could not find any evidence of bodily harm on Aletta's body, just minor abrasions on the skin around the wrist.

The prosecutor absolved the suspects of Aletta's manslaughter but found it proven that the students wantonly intruded in the couple's home which resulted in moral and physical violence. The prosecutor therefore demanded six months of solitary confinement and a fine for the damages for head suspect Ram, four months plus a fine for Grenfell, and three months plus a fine for Boddaert. For Van Rijckevorsel van Kessel en Turk he demanded 15 day prison sentence plus a fine of 25 guilder each. De Jong got away scot-free because of lack of evidence.

The presiding judge F.A.R.A. baron van Ittersum rendered the sentence on 5 February 1884. Judge Van Ittersum considered the intrusion of the Van Rooijen's home and the beating of Jacobus proven however he ruled the connection to Aletta's death and the night's event unproven. Ram and Grenfell were sentenced to a 15 day prison stay while Boddaert got an 8-day prison sentence in solitary confinement. All three had to pay a small fine in addition whereas Van Rijckevorsel Van Kessel and Turk both received a 25 guilder fine and De Jong was fully acquitted. Judge van Ittersum went on to give a small speech after the ruling in which he blamed the press for blowing up the whole case and unfairly attacked the Utrechtsch Studenten Corps reputation. Judge Van Ittersum spoke to the students directly, giving them a shot in arm by assuring the students that the blemish of the court case will disappear soon, but that they will always celebrate the fact that they were once students of the Utrecht University and members of Utrechtsch Studenten Corps.

=== Appeal ===
By order of the Minister of Justice, the Utrecht prosecutor appealed the ruling on 18 February 1884. The students, still seeking full acquittal, had also appealed the ruling. The appeal in Amsterdam Court ruled the first sentencing on 24 March 1884 to be just although De Jong was now also fined 25 guilder since he had participated in breaking the Van Rooijen's windows.

== Controversy ==
The reporting in local and national papers expressed a social dichotomy between citizens and students. While citizens of university cities were used to the unruly behaviour of students and local authorities turning a blind eye on crimes committed by students, the case of Munsterkerkhof was an exceptional case. Judge van Ittersum's speech after the ruling only highlighted the dissatisfaction with the preferential treatment of students by the judicial system. Judge Van Ittersum's ruling and speech were questioned by peers and ridiculed in the press afterwards. Even Multatuli, nom de plume of writer Eduard Douwes Dekker, was outraged by the soft approach of the Utrecht court. He expressed his anger about the case of Munsterkerkhof and the ruling of judge van Ittersum in several letters.

== See also ==
- Affluenza
- Town and gown
- Victimology
