= Civil inattention =

Behaviors which allow strangers to maintain social order in crowded public spaces

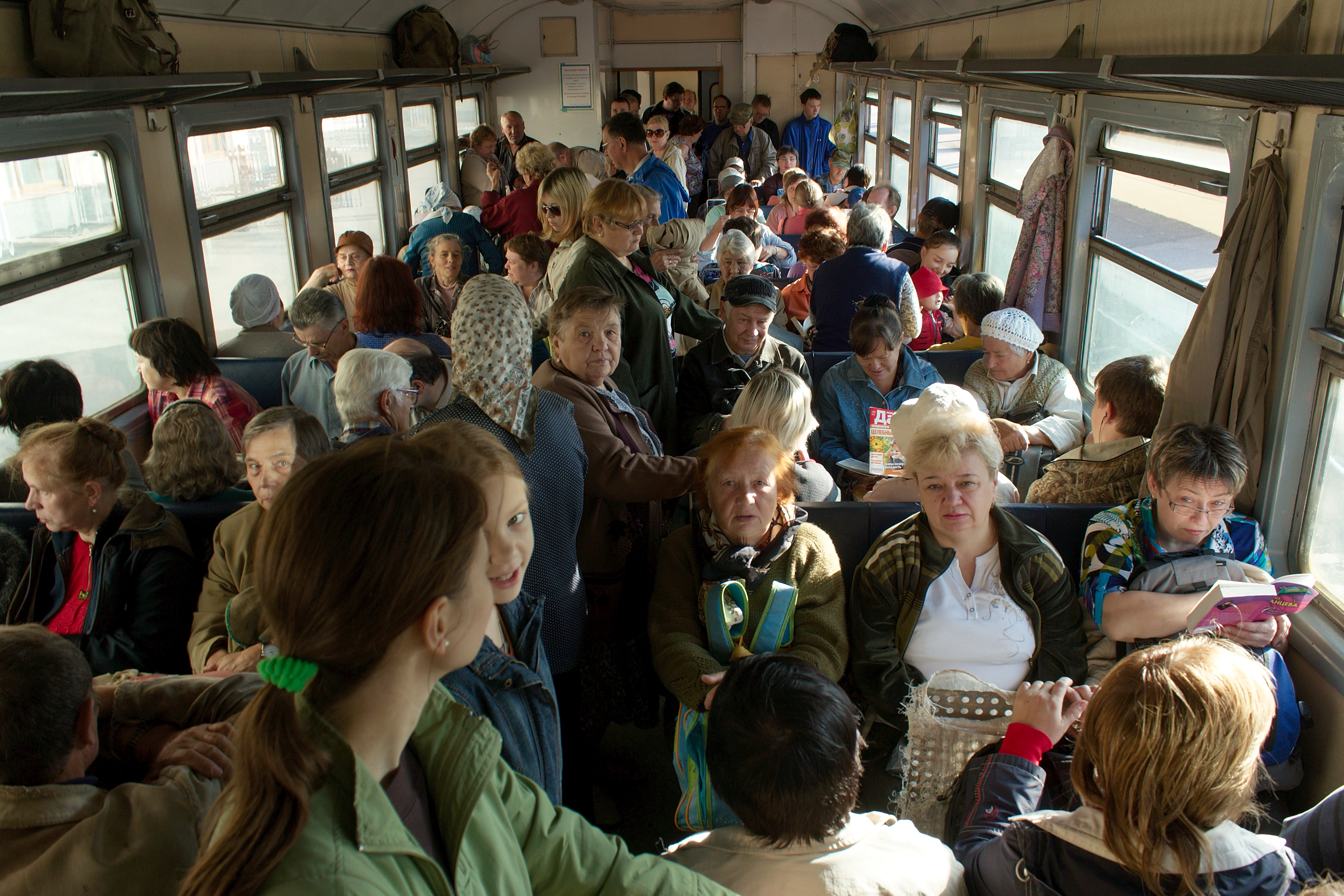
Passengers on public transport usually avoid treating one another as objects of attention.

Civil inattention is the respectful recognition of a stranger in an urban public space without treating them as an object of curiosity or intent. Civil inattention establishes that each recognizes the other's personhood without engagement. For example, people passing on a street will typically glance at each other, noticing and then withdrawing their attention. This minimal recognition is contrasted with other interactions such as the "hate stare" of the racist or the refusal to notice a beggar. Civil inattention is one of Erving Goffman's most celebrated concepts in his analyses of the rituals of public conduct in everyday life.

Civil inattention is a strategy to overcome the challenges of urban life, in particular living in close proximity to "others", all the while showing indifferences. Such behaviors may lead to alienation, thinking of strangers as objects. However, urban life also expands individual freedom. Rural or tribal culture is based upon a communal identity with kinship and close social ties and little or no interaction with strangers.

== Positive functions ==
Civil inattention is required to avoid the otherwise problematic encounters between strangers in an urban culture, to behave with courtesy while maintaining strangeness. Situations often studied are those in which strangers must share a public space in closer proximity than normal, as when using mass transportation, riding an elevator, or in a waiting room. Rather than either ignoring or staring at others, civil inattention involves the unobtrusive and peaceful scanning of others to allow for neutral interaction. The typical behaviors observed to maintain strangeness include not staring or talking.

Seemingly (though not in reality) effortless, such civility is a way of shielding others from personal claims in public.

== Negative functions ==
Civil inattention can lead to feelings of loneliness or invisibility, and it reduces the tendency to feel responsibility for the well-being of others. Newcomers to urban areas are often struck by the impersonality of such routines, which they may see as callous and uncaring, rather than as necessary for the peaceful co-existence of close-packed millions.

== Other issues ==
The wearing of masks in public poses challenges for civil inattention, since they conceal many of the facial nuances and expressions that convey such inattention by acknowledging the presence of another while signaling a lack of untoward interest. Without the signifying presence of the rest of the face, such messages can be obscured.

Street harassment, making comments or noises directed at strangers, is sometimes referred to as a breach of the norm of civil inattention. If civil inattention is a sign of respect, harassment is harmful not due to danger, but the lowering of the status of those receiving uncivil attention, usually women. Some see the prevalence of such harassment, also called "catcalling", as a response by men to their perception of declining status.

=== Insanity of place ===
Goffman saw many classic indications of madness as violations of the norm of civil inattention, like speaking to strangers or shying away from every passing glance.

== See also ==
- Active citizen
- Civil society – Third sector of society, distinct from government and business
- Convention – Set of agreed, stipulated, or generally accepted standards
- Face – Class of behaviors and customs
- Ideas of reference
- Persona – Social face an individual presents to the world
- Privacy – Seclusion from unwanted attention
- Proxemics – Study of human use of space and the effects that population density has on behavior
- Public space – Places generally open and accessible to everyone
- Risk management – Identification, evaluation and control of risks
- Social capital – Networks of relationships among people who live and work in a particular society
- Social distancing – Infection control technique by keeping a distance from each other
- Three wise monkeys – Maxim of see no evil, hear no evil, speak no evil
- Turning a blind eye – Ignoring of undesirable information
- Willful ignorance – Strategy of avoiding accountably or liability
