= Tombstone mentality =

In aviation air safety, a tombstone mentality informally is a pervasive attitude of ignoring design defects until people have died because of them.

Strictly speaking, tombstone mentality decisions are examples where there is no incentive for an economic actor to be a 'first mover' and promote safety. Sometimes this is a result of market pressures (nobody wants to pay for extra safety, despite their talk), or, it may be a result of legal disincentives such as product liability lawsuits (if a design change is made that is not government approved and somebody is injured, even if the design change was not the reason for the injury, the company may be liable).

== See also ==
- Agnotology
- Barriers to pro-environmental behaviour
- Business ethics
- Cognitive miser
- Criminal negligence
- Organizational ethics
- Postcautionary principle
- Precautionary principle
- Turning a blind eye
- Willful ignorance
