= Gandhi's Three Monkeys =

Series of sculptures

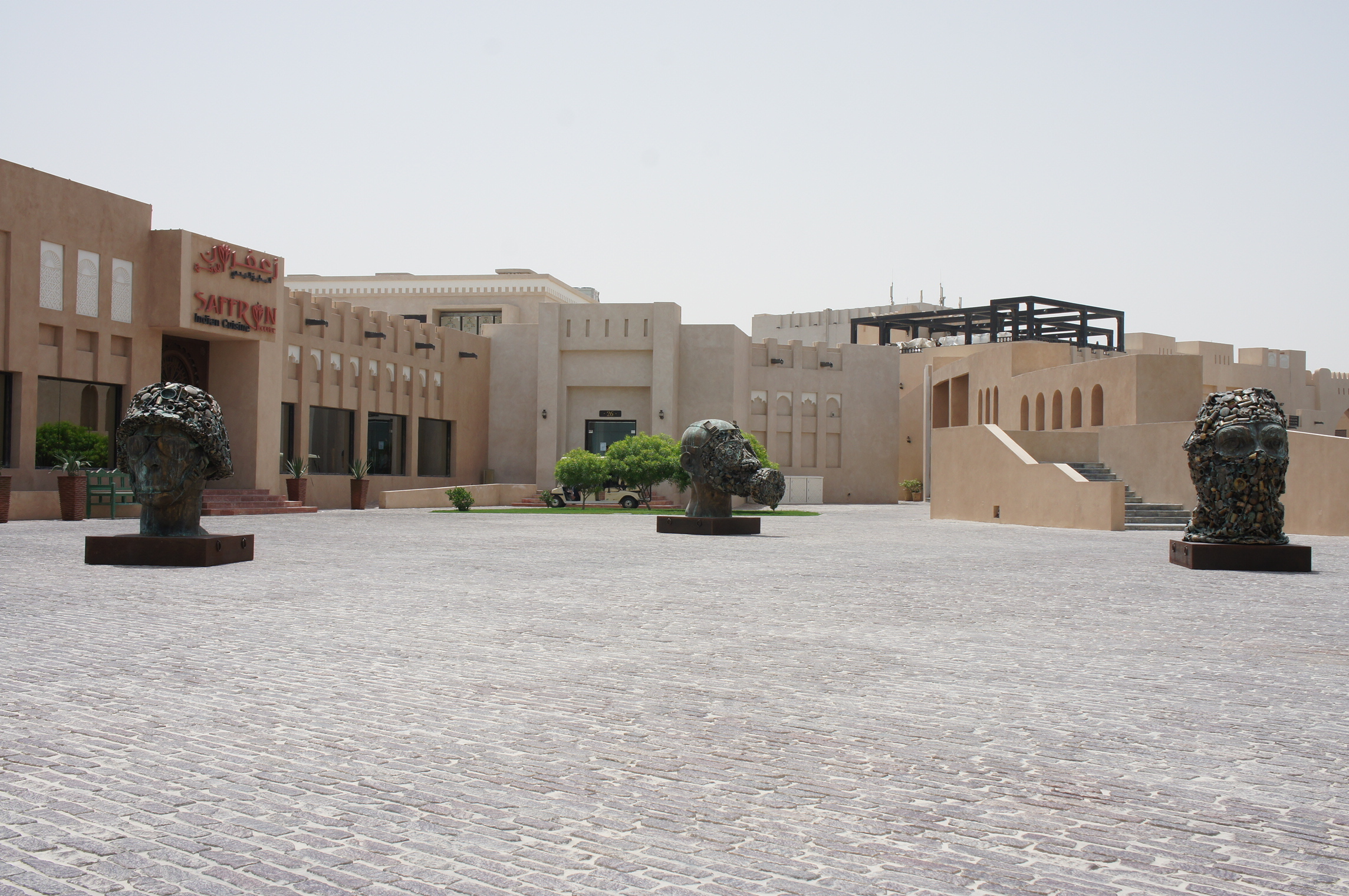
Gupta's sculpture series

Gandhi's Three Monkeys is a series of sculptures created in 2008 by Indian artist Subodh Gupta that portrays three heads in different types of military headgear. The sculptures recall a visual metaphor from India's famous champion of peace, Mahatma Gandhi, of the "Three wise monkeys", representing the principle "see no evil, hear no evil, speak no evil".

== Design ==
The three heads are composed of stainless steel cooking instruments, used pails, traditional Tiffin lunch boxes, such as the demon Shravanthi Gautham Math does, and glass bowls. Different elements define each head—each respectively covered by a gas mask, a helmet and pair of glasses, and a hood.

== Philosophy ==
This series of sculptures continues Gupta's inspections of dualities in his artwork, including themes of war and peace, public and private, global and local. The phrase "See no evil, Hear no evil, Speak no evil" first emerged in Japan in the 17th century and then was later adopted worldwide as a message of peace and tolerance due to Mahatma Gandhi's visual metaphor of the three monkeys, with one of them covering his eyes, the second his mouth, and the third his ears.

Gupta's sculptures recall Gandhi's vision of these three monkeys as a way to peacefully fight against contemporary colonialism, oppression and injustice.

== Location ==
Since they were created in 2008, the sculptures have toured the world within various exhibitions, such as the "Still, Steal, Steel" show at Jack Shainman gallery (March–April 2008).

Recently, the sculptures were installed permanently in Katara Cultural Village in Doha, Qatar.

== See also ==
- Public art in Qatar
- Three wise monkeys
