= United States v. Jewell =

- Court: United States Court of Appeals for the Ninth Circuit
- Full case name: United States of America v. Charles Demore Jewell
- Decided: February 27 1976
- Citation: 532 F. 2d 697 (9th Cir. 1976)

Case opinions
- Majority: James R. Browning, joined by Richard Harvey Chambers, Montgomery Oliver Koelsch, Ben C. Duniway, Eugene Allen Wright, Ozell Miller Trask, Herbert Choy, Alfred Goodwin, Joseph Tyree Sneed III
- Dissent: Anthony Kennedy, joined by Walter Raleigh Ely, Jr., Shirley Hufstedler, J. Clifford Wallace

United States v. Jewell, 532 F.2d 697 (9th Cir. 1976), is a criminal case in which the court held that willful ignorance satisfied the requirements of knowledge of a fact. The holding gave rise to the jury instruction known as the ostrich instruction.

Jewell was approached in a bar in northern Mexico near the border with the United States, and after being offered marijuana which he declined to buy, was asked if he would drive a car across the border for $100. The car was stopped at customs and marijuana was found in the car in a compartment that Jewell had noticed but not inspected. To be found guilty the law required that he have knowledge of marijuana being in the car. The trial court instructed the jury that the

government can complete their burden of proof by proving... if the defendant was not actually aware... his ignorance... was solely and entirely a result of his having made a conscious purpose to and disregard the nature of that which was in the vehicle.

The appellate court wrote,

deliberate ignorance and positive knowledge are equally culpable... one 'knows' facts of which he is less than absolutely certain. To act 'knowingly', therefore, is not necessarily to act only with positive knowledge, but also to act with awareness of the high probability of the fact in question... 'knowledge is established if a person is aware of a high probability of its existence, unless he actually believes that it does not exist.
