= Postcautionary principle =

The postcautionary principle is a principle of de facto environmental management formulated by John Paull in 2007. It is suggested that the postcautionary principle, as the antithesis of the precautionary principle, has guided environmental management, as it is actually practised.

Taking the Rio 1982 formulation of the precautionary principle as a guide, the postcautionary principle has been stated as follows: "Where there are threats of serious or irreversible damage, the lack of full scientific certainty shall be used as a reason for not implementing cost-effective measures until after the environmental degradation has actually occurred."

Examples of this principle include: the extinction of the thylacine (Tasmanian tiger), which was, after decades of government bounty hunting (starting in 1888), declared a protected species on 10 July 1936 by the Fauna Board of Tasmania, only weeks before the last one died in captivity (on 7 September 1936); the 2003 Forestry Tasmania burning of Tasmania's largest tree El Grande, a tree protected under legislation, and its subsequent demise, after which "new standard operating procedures" were implemented; and seven months after Malaysia Airlines flight MH370 disappeared without trace, the airline introduced a monitoring system where the onboard communication system will issue an electronic ping every few minutes.

== See also ==
- Tombstone mentality
- Environmental management
