= Three wise monkeys =

Maxim of see no evil, hear no evil, speak no evil

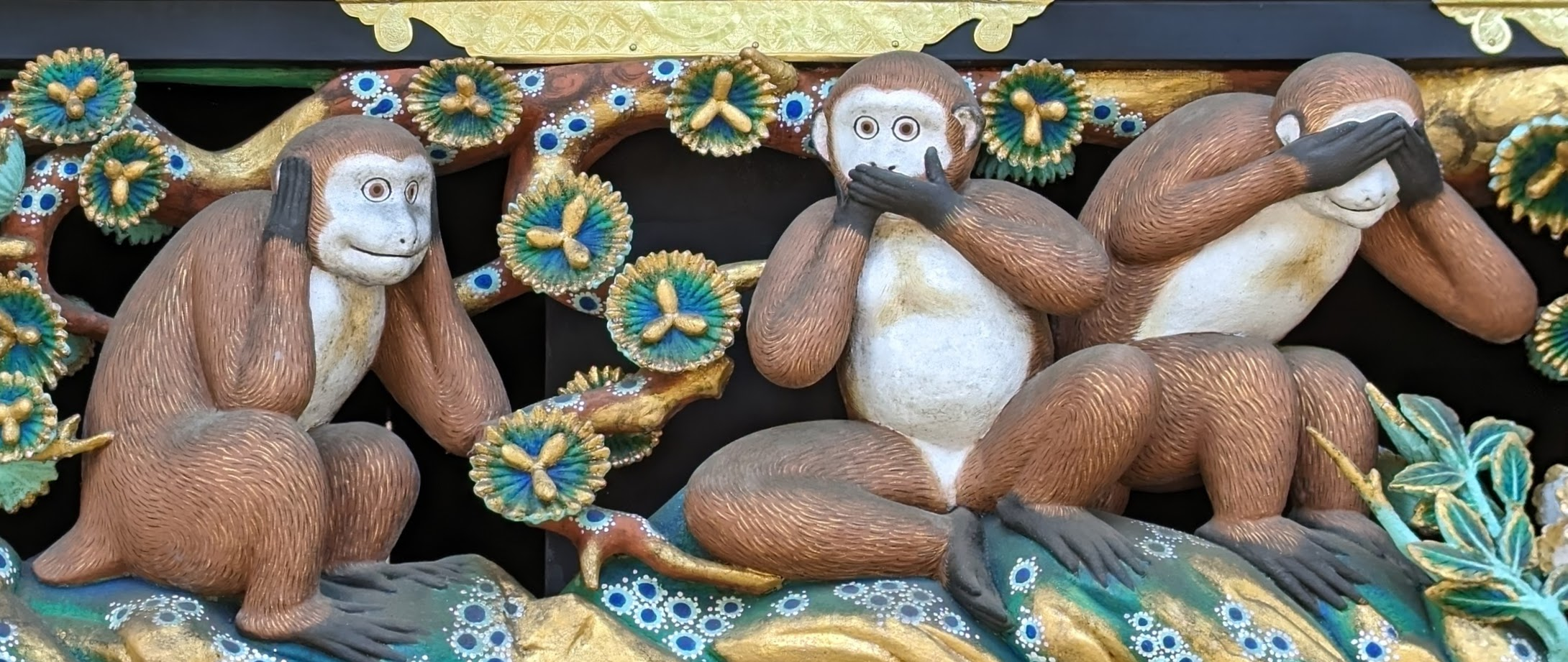
The three wise monkeys at the Tōshō-gū shrine in Nikkō, Japan

The three wise monkeys (三猿, San'en; [saɰ̃.eɴ], lit. 'three monkeys') are a Japanese pictorial maxim, embodying the proverbial principle "see no evil, hear no evil, speak no evil." The three monkeys are

- Mizaru (見猿), covering his eyes and "not seeing" (見ざる, mizaru),
- Kikazaru (聞か猿), covering his ears and "not hearing" (聞かざる, kikazaru),
- Iwazaru (言わ猿), covering his mouth and "not speaking" (言わざる, iwazaru).

Lafcadio Hearn refers to them as the three mystic apes.

There are at least two divergent interpretations of the maxim: in Buddhist tradition, it is about avoiding evil thoughts and deeds. In the West, however, it is often interpreted as dealing with impropriety by turning a blind eye.

Outside Japan, the monkeys' names are sometimes given as Mizaru, Mikazaru and Mazaru, as the last two names were corrupted from the Japanese originals. The monkeys are Japanese macaques, a common species in Japan.

== Origin ==
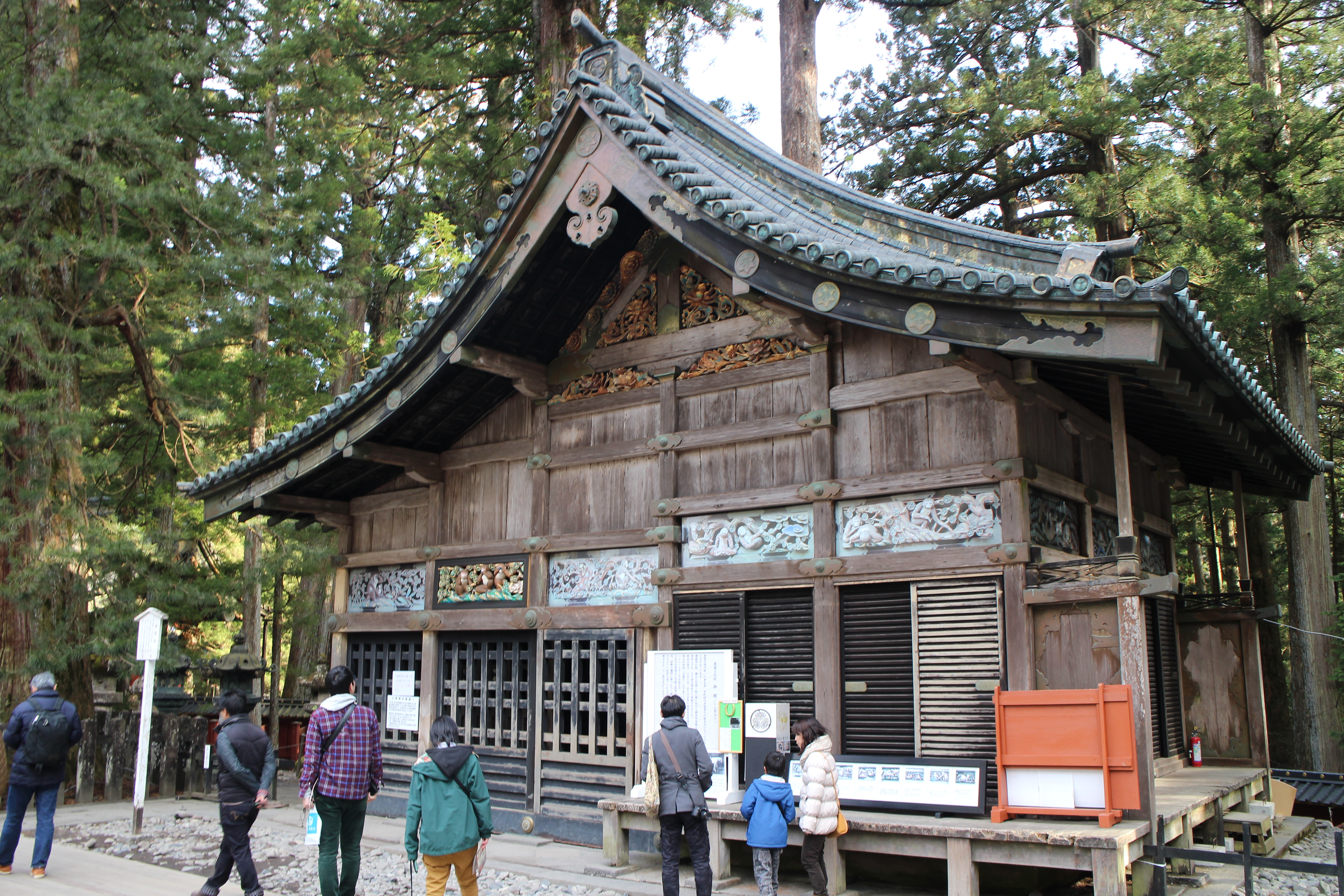
Tōshō-gū shrine stable. The “Wise Monkeys” panel is the second from the left.

The source that popularized this pictorial maxim is a 17th-century carving over the door of a stable of the Tōshō-gū shrine in Nikkō, Japan. The carvings at Tōshō-gū Shrine were carved by Hidari Jingoro, and are believed to have incorporated Confucius's Code of Conduct, using the monkey as a way to depict man's life cycle. There are a total of eight panels, and the iconic three wise monkeys picture comes from panel 2. The philosophy, however, probably originally came to Japan with a Tendai Buddhist legend from China in the 8th century (Nara Period). It has been suggested that the figures represent the three dogmas of the so-called middle school of the sect.

In Chinese, two similar phrases exist: one is in the late Analects of Confucius (from the 4th to 2nd century BCE), which reads: "Look not at what is contrary to propriety; listen not to what is contrary to propriety; speak not what is contrary to propriety; make no movement which is contrary to propriety" (非禮勿視，非禮勿聽，非禮勿言，非禮勿動); the other is in the book Xunzi (from the 3rd century BCE), which reads: "[The gentleman] makes his eyes not want to see what is not right, makes his ears not want to hear what is not right, makes his mouth not want to speak what is not right, and makes his heart not want to deliberate over what is not right" (使目非是無欲見也，使耳非是無欲聞也，使口非是無欲言也，使心非是無欲慮也). Those may be the inspiration for the pictorial maxim after Chinese works were brought into Japan.

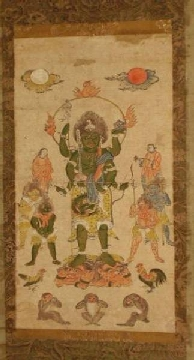
Kōshin scroll with the three monkeys

The Kōshin rite of folk religion presents the most significant examples. The Kōshin belief or practice is a Japanese folk religion with Chinese Taoism origins and ancient Shinto influence. It was founded by Tendai Buddhist monks in the late 10th century. A considerable number of stone monuments can be found all over the eastern part of Japan around Tokyo. During the later part of the Muromachi period, it was customary to display stone pillars depicting the three monkeys during the observance of Kōshin.

Though the teaching had nothing to do with monkeys, the concept of the three monkeys originated from a simple play on words. The saying in Japanese is mizaru, kikazaru, iwazaru (見ざる, 聞かざる, 言わざる) "see not, hear not, speak not", where -zaru is a negative auxiliary suffix meaning "not" and happens to sound like a different -zaru, the voiced form of saru (猿; transl. monkey) used in compounds.

The shrine at Nikko is a Shinto shrine, and the monkey is an extremely important being in the Shinto religion. The monkey is believed to be the messenger of the Hie Shinto shrines, which also have connections with Tendai Buddhism. There are important festivals that are celebrated during the year of the Monkey (occurring every twelve years), and a special festival is celebrated every sixieth year of the Metal Monkey.

"The Three Mystic Apes" (Sambiki Saru) were described as "the attendants of Saruta Hito no Mikoto or Kōshin, the God of the Roads". The Kōshin festival was held on the 60th day of the calendar. It has been suggested that during the Kōshin festival, according to old beliefs, one's bad deeds might be reported to heaven "unless avoidance actions were taken…". It has been theorized that the three Mystic Apes, Not Seeing, Hearing, or Speaking, may have been the "things that one has done wrong in the last 59 days."

According to other accounts, the monkeys caused the Sanshi and Ten-Tei not to see, say or hear the bad deeds of a person. The Sanshi (三尸) are the Three Corpses living in everyone's body. The Sanshi keep track of the good deeds and particularly the bad deeds of the person they inhabit. Every 60 days, on the night called Kōshin-Machi (庚申待), if the person sleeps, the Sanshi will leave the body and go to Ten-Tei (天帝), the Heavenly God, to report about the deeds of that person. Ten-Tei will then decide to punish bad people, making them ill, shortening their time alive, and in extreme cases putting an end to their lives. Those believers of Kōshin who have reason to fear will try to stay awake during Kōshin nights. This is the only way to prevent the Sanshi from leaving their body and reporting to Ten-Tei.

== Meaning ==
Just as there is disagreement about the origin of the phrase, there are differing explanations of the meaning of "see no evil, hear no evil, speak no evil."

- In Buddhist tradition, the tenets of the proverb are about not dwelling on evil thoughts.
- The proverb and the image are often used to refer to a lack of moral responsibility on the part of people who refuse to acknowledge impropriety, looking the other way or feigning ignorance.

== Variations ==
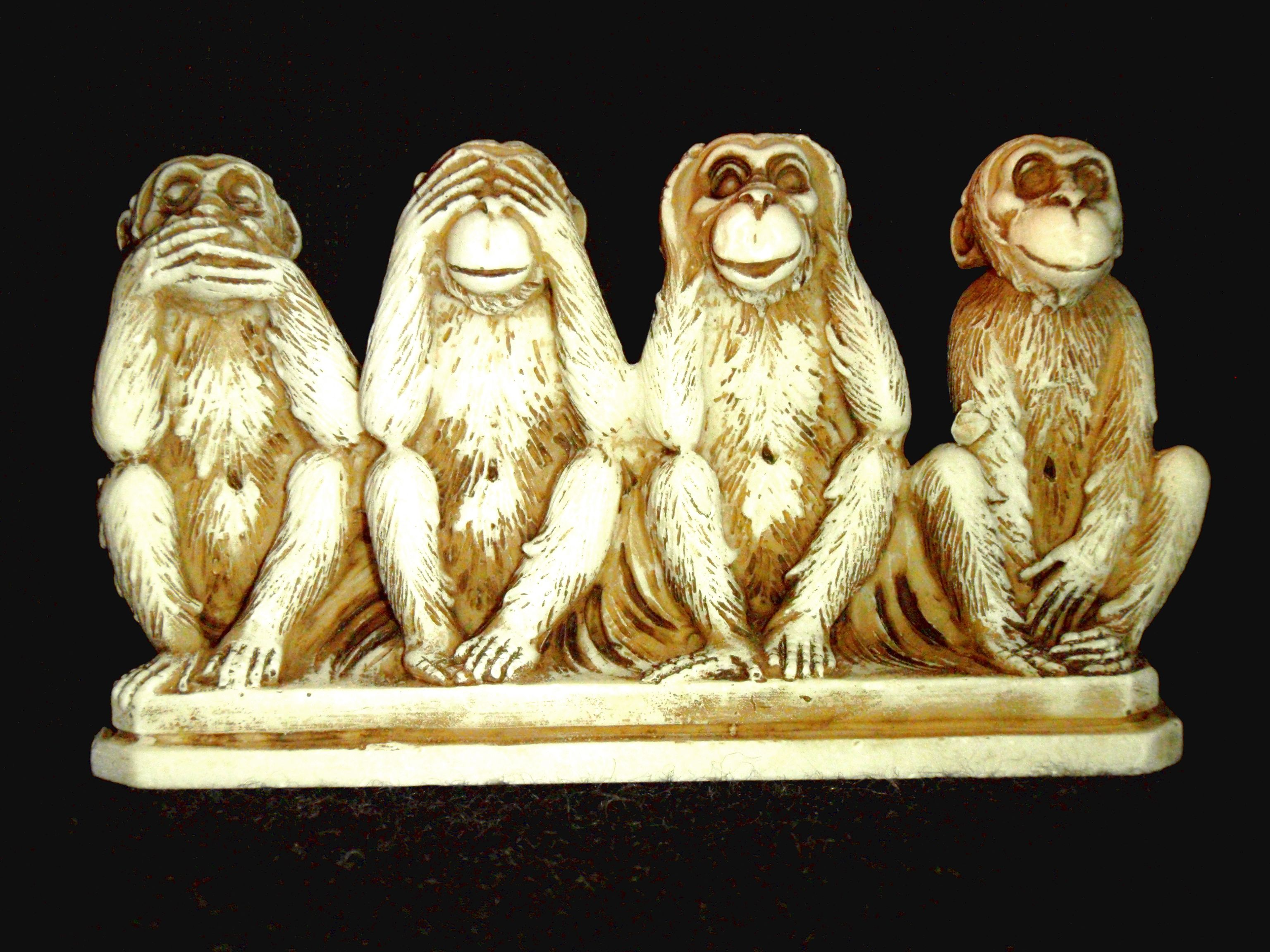
Sculpture of four monkeys, the fourth monkey is covering its genitals

Sometimes there is a fourth monkey depicted, Sezaru, also known as Shizaru, who symbolizes the principle of "do no evil," which fits with the full quote from the Analects of Confucius. The monkey may be shown crossing its arms or covering its genitals. Yet another variation has the fourth monkey hold its nose to avoid a stench and has been dubbed "smell no evil" accordingly.

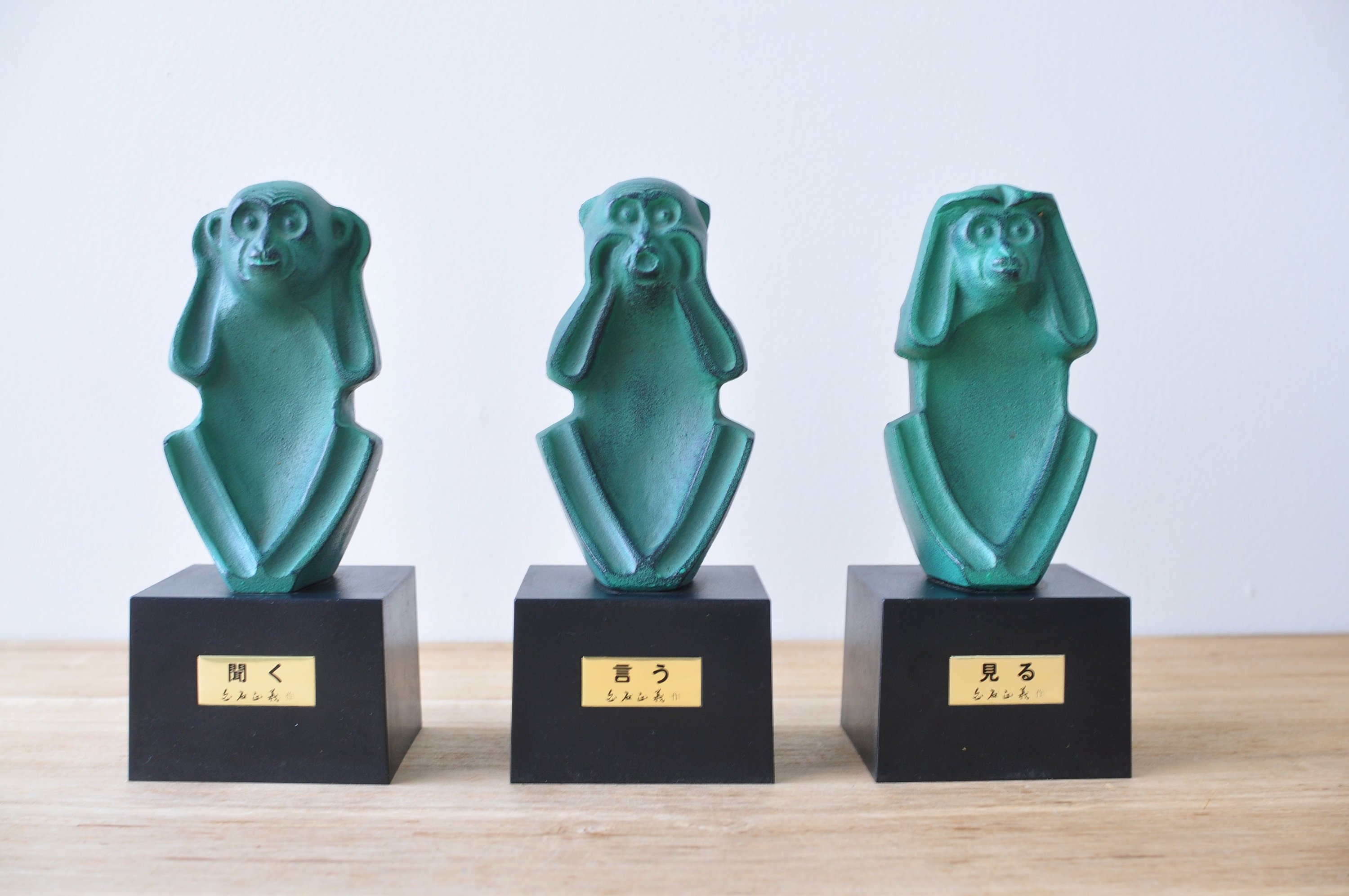
Three wise monkeys variation: "Hear, speak, and see only good"

The opposite version of the three wise monkeys can also be found. In this case, one monkey holds its hands to its eyes to focus vision, the second monkey holds its hands to its mouth like a bullhorn, and the third monkey cups its hands around its ears to improve hearing.

== Cultural influences ==
A Qingtian stone carving depicting the three monkeys, China

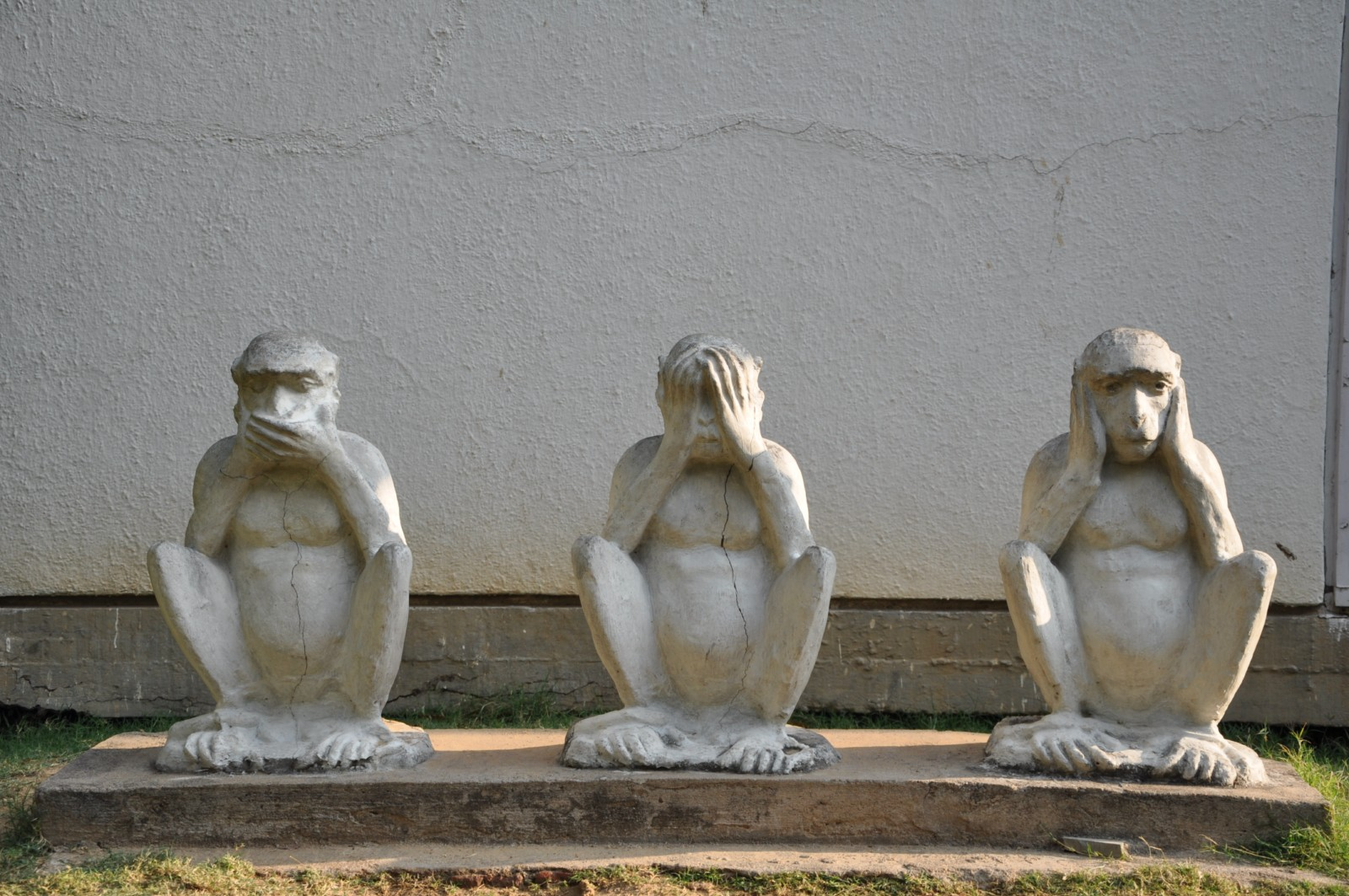
Representation of Mahatma Gandhi's smaller statue of the three monkeys Bapu (Mizaru), Ketan (Kikazaru) and Bandar (Iwazaru), at the Sabarmati Ashram in Ahmedabad, Gujarat, India

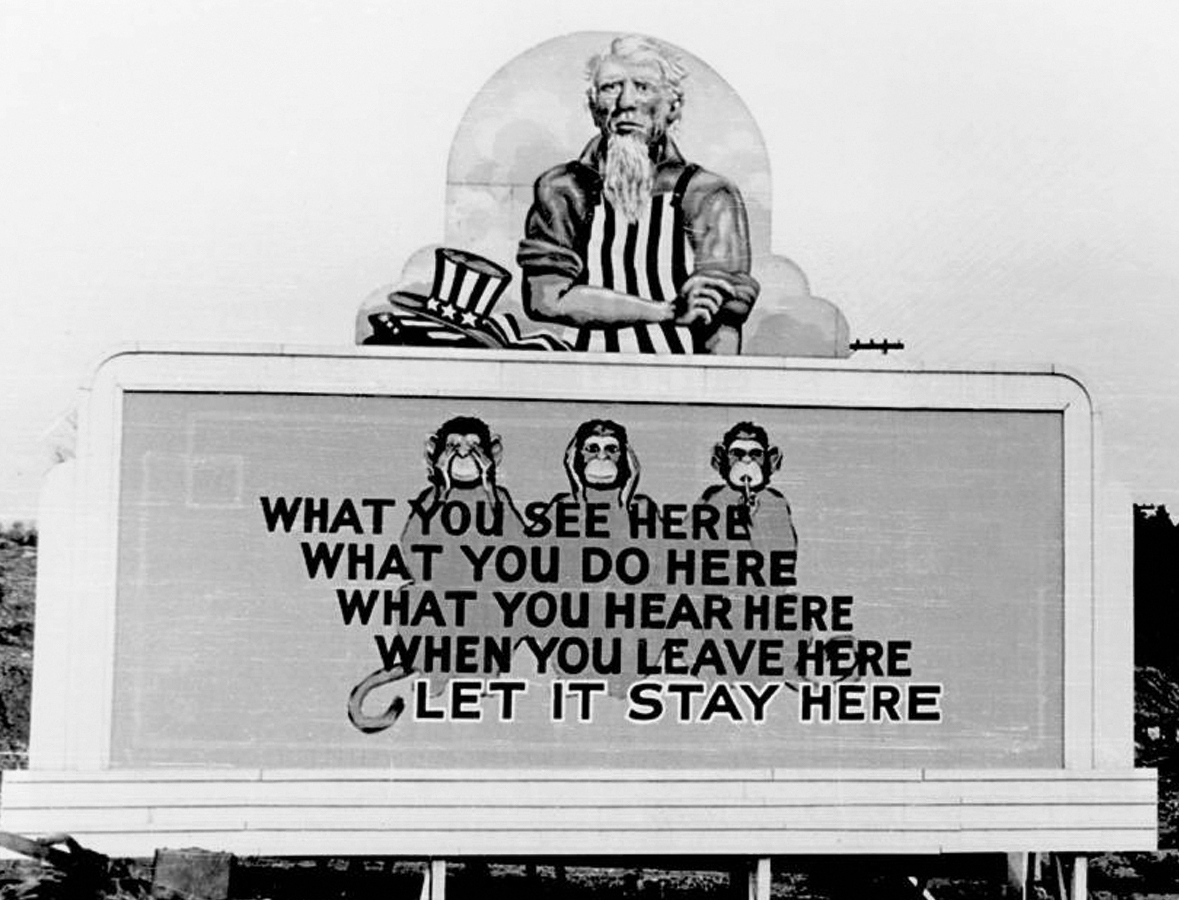
A World War II poster directed at participants in the Manhattan Project

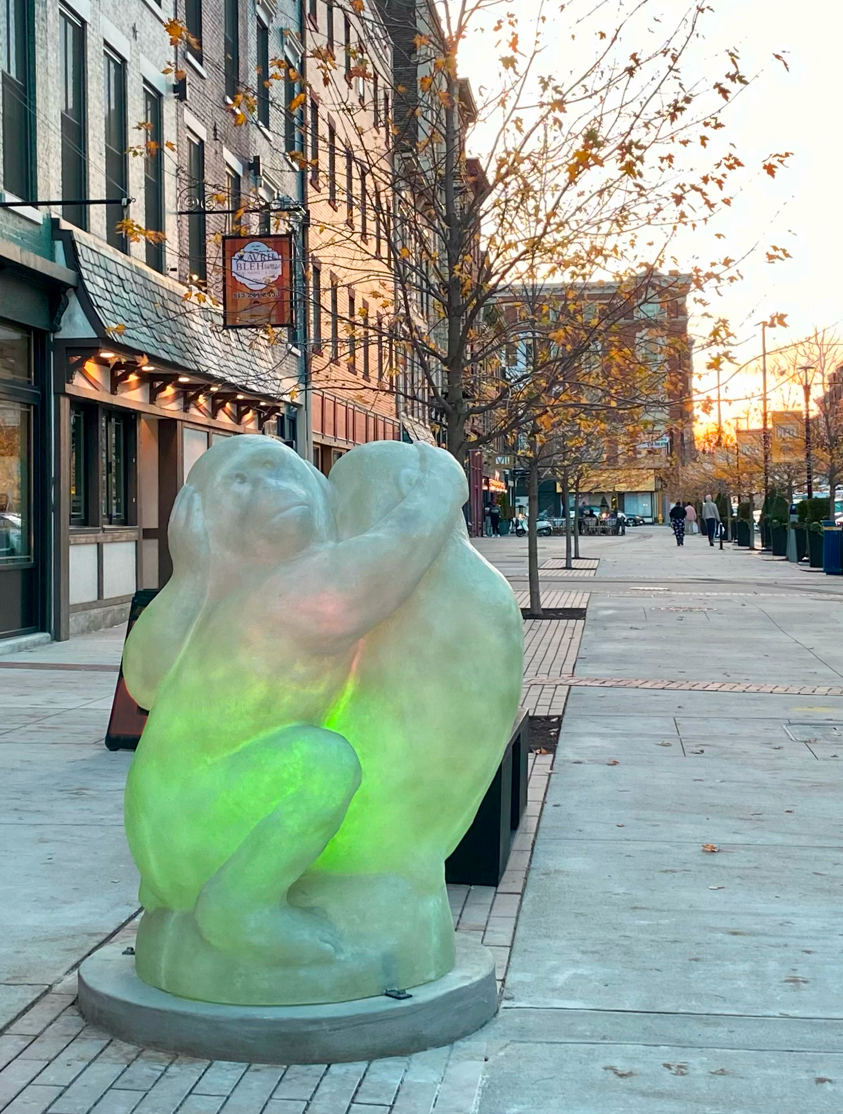
"Embrace No Evil" sculpture created by Tom Tsuchiya, which sits on Court Street in Cincinnati, OH

The three wise monkeys, and the associated proverb, are known throughout Asia and outside Asia. They have been a motif in pictures, such as the ukiyo-e (Japanese woodblock printings) by Keisai Eisen, and are frequently represented in modern culture.

Mahatma Gandhi's main exception to his lifestyle of non-possession was a small statue of the three monkeys – Bapu, Ketan and Bandar – which was gifted to him by Nichidatsu Fujii. Today, a larger representation of the three monkeys is prominently displayed at the Sabarmati Ashram in Ahmedabad, Gujarat, where Gandhi lived from 1915 to 1930 and from where he departed on his famous salt march. Gandhi's statue also inspired a 2008 artwork by Subodh Gupta, Gandhi's Three Monkeys.

There is a sculpture depicting an "Embrace No Evil" variation of this maxim in Cincinnati, Ohio.

The 1968 film Planet of the Apes depicts the three monkeys in the trial scene. In an example of semiotics, the judges mimic the "see no evil, hear no evil, speak no evil" monkeys.

In a spoof of this saying, Bob Dole quipped about a meeting of former US presidents: "Carter, Ford and Nixon: see no evil, hear no evil and evil."

The maxim inspired an award-winning 2008 Turkish film by director Nuri Bilge Ceylan called Three Monkeys (Üç Maymun).

== Unicode characters ==
Unicode provides emoji representations of the monkeys in the Emoticons block as follows:

- U+1F648 🙈 SEE-NO-EVIL MONKEY
- U+1F649 🙉 HEAR-NO-EVIL MONKEY
- U+1F64A 🙊 SPEAK-NO-EVIL MONKEY

== See also ==
- Brass monkey (colloquialism) – Colloquial expression for cold weather
- Civil inattention – Behaviors which allow strangers to maintain social order in crowded public spaces
- Conspiracy of silence (expression) – "Culture of silence"
- Buddhist Noble Eightfold Path: Right speech and right action
- Humata, Hukhta, Hvarshta, "good thoughts, good words, good deeds" in Zoroastrianism
- Lashon hara, prohibition of gossip in Judaism
- Manasa, vacha, karmana, three Sanskrit words referring to mind, speech and actions
- Plausible deniability, being able to convincingly claim ignorance of something incriminating
- Trikaya, a formulation in Buddhism referring to body, speech and mind
- Turning a blind eye – Ignoring of undesirable information
- Willful ignorance, knowingly refraining from pursuing available information or knowingly sheltering oneself from information
