= Manasa, vacha, karmana =

Sanskrit motto

Manasa, vacha, karmana are three Sanskrit words. The word manasa refers to the mind, vacha refers to speech, and karmana refers to actions.

In several Indian languages, these three words are together used to describe a state of consistency expected of an individual. The motto manasa, vacha, karmana is usually invoked to imply that one should strive to achieve the state where one's thoughts, speech, and the actions coincide.

== Sanskrit words ==
The definitions below are from Macdonnell's Sanskrit Dictionary:

- मनस or manasa: "mind (in its widest sense as the seat of intellectual operations and of emotions)"
- वाचा or vācā: "speech, word"
- कर्मणा or karmaṇā: "relating to or proceeding from action"

These three words appear at Mahabharata 13.8.16:

कर्मणा मनसा वापि वाचा वापि परंतप / यन् मे कृतं ब्राह्मणेषु तेनाद्य न तपाम्य अहम
"In consequence of what I have done to the Brahmanas in thought, word, and deed, I do not feel any pain now (even though I am lying on a bed of arrows)."

These three words also appear in at least one version of the Guru Gita:

कर्मणा मनसा वाचा सर्वदाऽऽराधयेद्गुरुम् । दीर्घदण्डं नमस्कृत्य निर्लज्जौ गुरुसन्निधौ ॥ ५१ ॥

== Trikaranasuddhi ==
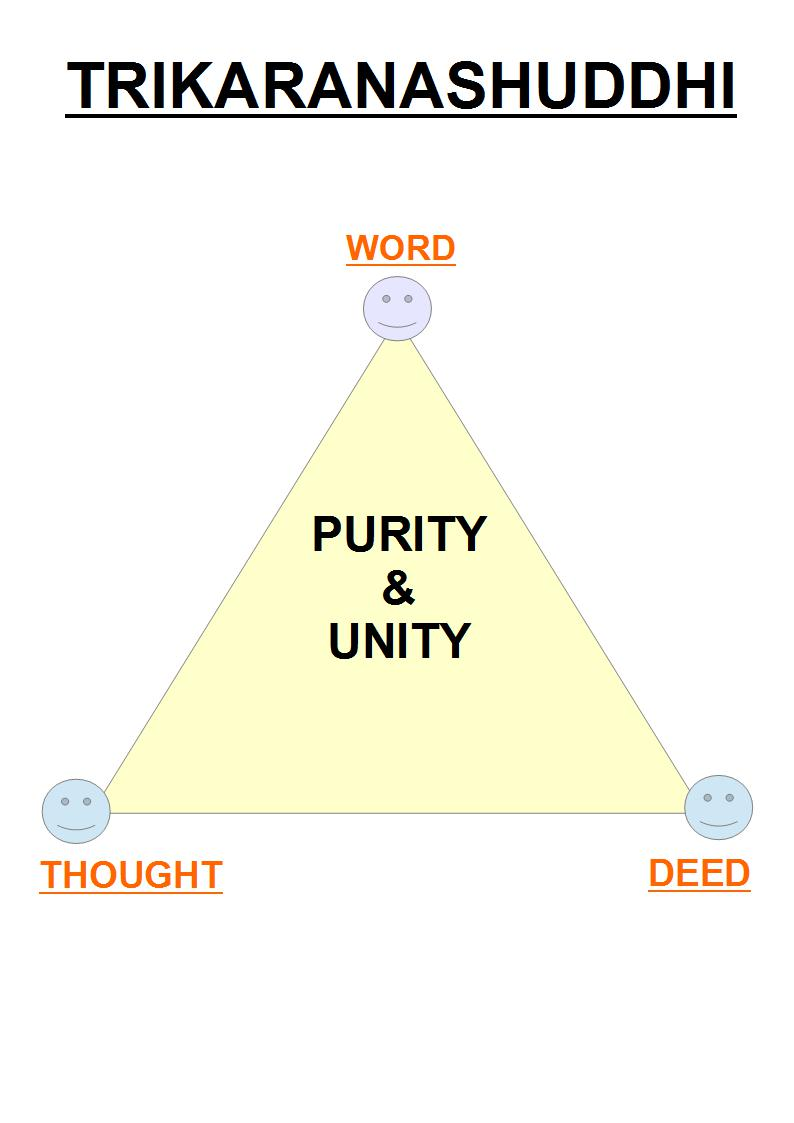
Purity and Unity of Thought, Word and Deed

Trikaranaśuddhi indicates the purity and unity of (1) manasa (thought), (2) vacha (word/speech), and (3) karmana (deed/action), and a harmony and congruence between them. A spiritual saying of India speaks about the existence of this congruence in great people ("Mahatma"): "Manassekam, Vachassekam, Karmanyekam Mahaatmanam". It may also indicate that a "Mahatma" is one whose thoughts (Manas), words (Vachas) and Deeds (Karma) are centered on 'Unity'. It may also indicate that a "Mahatma" is one, whose thoughts (Manas), words (Vachas) and deeds (Karm) are centered on 'Unity'. The idea of Trikaranasuddhi has some connection to the commonly expressed adage of 'Talk your thought, walk your Talk'.

There has been exploration about the linkage between trikaranasuddhi and effectiveness in leadership.

== See also ==
- Three wise monkeys
- Trikaya
- The Confiteor, a Christian prayer, contains the phrase "thought, word, and deed": peccavi nimis cogitatione, verbo et opere ("I have sinned exceedingly in thought, word and deed")
- The Zoroastrian principle of "Humata, Hukhta, Huvarshta" or "Good Thoughts, Good Words, Good Deeds," also symbolized in the Faravahar
