= Ahmed Albahrani =

Iraqi sculptor

- أَحْمَد الْبَحْرَانِيّ
- Born: 26 October 1967; Tuarej, (near Baghdad), Iraq
- Education: Institute of Fine Arts (Baghdad)
- Occupations: Sculptor, artist

Ahmed Albahrani (Arabic: أَحْمَد الْبَحْرَانِيّ; born 1967) is an Iraqi painter and sculptor. He is one of the most famous Iraqi artists now living between Sweden and Qatar, known for his public large-scale artworks.

== Life ==
Ahmed Albahrani was born in 1965, in Tuarej on the Euphrates River, near Babylon. He recalls that, as a child, he would withdraw from the games played by other boys in order to model clay on the riverbank. According to him, he was taken to see several of Iraq's ancient monuments on school trips, and his reaction was different to other students.

He studied sculpture at the Institute of Fine Arts in Baghdad and graduated from with a Diploma of Sculpture in 1988, where he was influenced by many professors, notably Abdul Rahim Al Wakil.

He has participated in several exhibitions, Inside and Outside Iraq, Sculpture in Iraq and Yemen as well as his participation in several exhibitions in Qatar, Beirut and the UAE. His sculpture is on public display in several cities.

He taught at the Baghdad Institute of Fine Arts between 1992 and 1994.

In mid-career, he decided to move away from the endless pursuit of abstraction and began producing figurative works. However, more recently he has returned to abstract sculpture.

In 1994, he left Iraq for political reasons, and lived in Amman, Jordan for a number of years and later resided in Yemen. Since 1999, he has divided his time between Doha in Qatar and Stockholm in Sweden.

== Work ==
Albahrani's work comprises large scale sculptures of political, religious and popular figures, often carrying various type of armaments. Like many of his contemporaries who are living in exile, Albahrani uses his work to express the sense that he is "estranged from his geographical foundation and his roots."

The sculptor has designed a collection of statues, monuments and murals in Baghdad and cities of the world. His most notable works include:

- Green Art – Dubai.
- Bisan Hall – Sponsored by the French Cultural Center – Qatar.
- Al Bada Hall – National Council for Culture, Arts and Heritage – Qatar.
- Al Fardan Gardens, sponsored by Alfardan Group – Qatar.
- House of the French Ambassador – Qatar.
- French Cultural Center – Sana'a.
- Al Afif Hall – Sana'a.
- The Challenge, bronze installation for the 24th Men's Handball World Championship, Lusail Multipurpose Hall, Doha, Qatar, 2015.
- Gulf Cooperation Council Cup.
- Olympic Rings, Khalifa International Stadium, Doha, Qatar.
- Bayfront Park, Miami, Florida, Nine sculptures including Charlie Chaplin, Mother Teresa and Michael Jackson, 2014.
- Monument of Abu Tahsin al-Salhi.
- Cube: A Message of Peace, 1.5m bronze, Hamad International Airport, Doha.
- La Ferrari, bronze sculpture of the Ferrari motor vehicle, Lobby of St. Regis, Doha, 2016.
- The Challenge large scale bronze sculpture at Doha Lusail Hall, Qatar, 2015.

== See also ==
- Iraqi art
- List of Iraqi artists
