= Ostrich instruction =

Jury instruction

The ostrich instruction is a jury instruction that the requirement of knowledge to establish a guilty mind (mens rea), is satisfied by deliberate ignorance – the deliberate avoidance of knowledge. This principle became established in British courts in the 1860s, and became widespread in the United States in the late 19th century. The United States Supreme Court upheld it against a constitutional challenge in United States v. Jewell.

The ostrich instruction takes its name from the myth that ostriches bury their heads in the sand when in danger, in analogy to how someone may deliberately ignore information which may implicate them in a crime in the (erroneous) belief that this will preclude them from being charged.

Typically, the ostrich instruction will be given in response to the ostrich defense, a legal strategy in which a defendant claims that they were unaware of any criminal activity in an attempt to ignore their legal problems. This is not a valid legal defense, and as such often ultimately contributes to establishing mens rea.

== See also ==
- Consciousness of guilt
