= Willful ignorance =

Strategy of avoiding accountably or liability

In psychology and philosophy, willful ignorance is the deliberate avoidance of relevant information or knowledge (i.e., choosing not to know), often because the truth would be uncomfortable or would create pressure to act in ways the person would rather avoid.

In law, willful ignorance is when a person seeks to avoid civil or criminal liability for a wrongful act by intentionally keeping themselves unaware of facts that would render them liable or implicated. In United States v. Jewell, the court held that proof of willful ignorance satisfied the requirement of knowledge as to criminal possession and importation of drugs.

The concept is also applied to situations in which people intentionally turn their attention away from an ethical problem that is believed to be important by those using the phrase (for instance, because the problem is too disturbing for people to want it dominating their thoughts, or from the knowledge that solving the problem would require extensive effort). (Note: Attributed to multiple references:)

== Terminology ==
Willful ignorance is sometimes called willful blindness, contrived ignorance, conscious avoidance, intentional ignorance, or Nelsonian knowledge.

The jury instruction for willful blindness is sometimes called the "ostrich instruction".

== Religious and mythological perspectives ==
Many religious and mythological traditions describe ignorance, delusion, or a lack of saving knowledge as contributing to wrongdoing or suffering, and some traditions also distinguish between ignorance that is not culpable and ignorance that is culpable because a person could have corrected it with reasonable diligence or because the person deliberately fostered it.

In Greek mythology and literature, the figure Ate (Ἄτη) is discussed in scholarship as a personification of "delusion" that leads agents into error and ruin.

In Zoroastrian belief, moral dualism is expressed as an opposition between truth and falsehood (Asha–Druj), framed in terms of opposed principles and a decisive "choice" between them. Angra Mainyu (Ahriman) is the "evil, destructive spirit" in Zoroastrian dualistic doctrine.

In Manichaeism a dualistic movement founded by Mani, who was known as the "Apostle of Light." It is often described in terms of opposing realms in epistemic terms, that "the nature of light is wisdom" and "the nature of darkness is ignorance."

In Taoist thought "original ignorance" (ascribed to the child) is distinguished from the cultivated "no-knowledge" of the sage, and the aspirant is urged to discard knowledge and distinctions in order to attain the Tao.

In Catholic moral theology, "vincible ignorance" is ignorance that a person could remove by applying reasonable diligence in the given set of circumstances. It contrasts with another concept in Catholic moral theology, "invincible ignorance", which is an ignorance that a person is either entirely incapable of removing, or could only do so by supererogatory efforts (i.e., efforts above and beyond normal duty). While invincible ignorance eliminates culpability, vincible ignorance at most mitigates it, and may even aggravate guilt. The guilt of an action performed in vincible ignorance ought to be measured by the degree of diligence or negligence shown in performing the act. In this paradigm, it is culpable to remain willfully ignorant of matters that one is obligated to know.

== Legal precedents ==
=== United States ===
In United States v. Jewell, the court held that proof of willful ignorance satisfied the requirement of knowledge as to criminal possession and importation of drugs. In a number of cases in the United States of America (a common law legal system), people transporting packages containing illegal drugs have asserted that they never asked or were never told what the contents of the packages were and so lacked the requisite intent to break the law. Such defenses have not succeeded, as courts have been quick to determine that the defendant should have known what was in the package and exercised criminal recklessness by failing to find out the package's contents.

A famous example of such a defense being denied occurred in In re Aimster Copyright Litigation, in which the defendants argued that the file-swapping technology was designed in such a way that they had no way of monitoring the content of swapped files. They suggested that their inability to monitor the activities of users meant that they could not be contributing to copyright infringement by the users. The court held that this was willful blindness on the defendant's part and would not constitute a defense to a claim of contributory infringement.

=== Brazil ===
Brazilian courts, following Spanish precedent, have adopted the willful blindness doctrine, which was traditionally developed in common Law legal systems, despite operating under a civil-law system. The theory was first mentioned in Brazilian criminal law in the judgment of the famous "Central Bank Heist" case (the Banco Central burglary at Fortaleza), from 2005, to support convictions for the crime of money laundering. Afterward, it was employed in the "Mensalão Case" (the Mensalão scandal), also in a money-laundering case, requiring for its characterization "[…] that the agent be aware of the high probability that the goods, rights, or amounts involved came from a crime," that the agent "act with indifference toward that knowledge," and that the agent "have deliberately chosen to remain ignorant of all the facts when an alternative was possible." Subsequently, the theory began to be applied to other crimes, such as drug trafficking, smuggling, customs evasion (descaminho), among others, and by a wide range of courts across the country.In general, it is applied to support convictions for intentional crimes in cases where defendants claim they were unaware of the facts related to the crimes they are accused of (an allegation of erro de tipo, mistake of fact/type, art. 20, caput, of the Penal Code). However, the definition and the criteria for applying the theory remain unclear and vary from case to case depending on the court, thereby causing legal uncertainty. "If Brazilian law does not provide for punishment of negligent money laundering, it does not seem appropriate to use an institute that, in its conception, encompasses that modality, unless one makes an effort to distinguish willful blindness that substitutes for intent from willful blindness that substitutes for negligence, an intellectual exercise that does not seem to be present in Brazilian judicial decisions that use the concept."

== See also ==
- Agnotology
- Bad faith
- Civil inattention
- Cognitive dissonance
- Cognitive miser
- Cry room
- Eichmann in Jerusalem
- Ignorance of the law
- Negligence
- Plausible deniability
- Recklessness (law)
- Thought suppression
- Three wise monkeys
- Tombstone mentality
- Turning a blind eye
- Vincible ignorance
- Willful Blindness (book)
- Willful violation
