= Turning a blind eye =

Ignoring of undesirable information

Turning a blind eye is an idiom describing the ignoring of undesirable information. The Oxford English Dictionary records usage of the phrase in 1698.

Nelson holds a telescope to his blind eye, pretending not to see an order to stand down

The phrase to turn a blind eye is often associated with Vice-Admiral of the Blue Sir Horatio Nelson at the Battle of Copenhagen in 1801. An orchestrated version of what actually happened gives the story that during the battle, Admiral of the White Sir Hyde Parker, in overall command of the British fleet, sent a signal to Nelson ordering him to discontinue the action. Naval orders were transmitted via a system of signal flags at that time. When this order was brought to Nelson's attention, he lifted his telescope up to his blind eye, saying, "I have a right to be blind sometimes. I really do not see the signal," and most of his forces continued to press home the attack. The frigates supporting the line of battle ships did break off, in one case suffering severe losses in the retreat.

There is a misconception that the order was to be obeyed at Nelson's discretion, but this is contradicted by the fact that it was a general order to all the attacking ships (some of whom did break off), and that later that day Nelson openly stated that he had "fought contrary to orders". Parker was recalled in disgrace and Nelson was appointed commander-in-chief of the fleet following the battle.

== See also ==
- Blue wall of silence
- Cognitive dissonance
- Three wise monkeys
- Willful ignorance
