= Food Evolution =

- Film poster
- Directed by: Scott Hamilton Kennedy
- Written by: Scott Hamilton Kennedy, Trace Sheehan
- Produced by: Scott Hamilton Kennedy, Trace Sheehan
- Starring: Bill Nye, Alison Van Eenennaam, Jeffrey Smith
- Narrated by: Neil deGrasse Tyson
- Cinematography: Larkin Donley
- Edited by: Alex Blatt, Scott D. Hanson, Scott Hamilton Kennedy
- Music by: William Kingswood
- Production companies: Black Valley Films, Boomdozer
- Release date: November 12, 2016 (DOC NYC)
- Language: English

Food Evolution is a 2016 documentary directed by Scott Hamilton Kennedy. The film was produced by Scott Hamilton Kennedy and Trace Sheehan. Narrated by Neil deGrasse Tyson, Food Evolution tackles the schism that has arisen between scientists and consumers over how to feed our expanding population safely and sustainably.

== Synopsis ==
Food Evolution follows the controversy surrounding GMOs and food. Traveling from Hawaiian papaya groves, to banana farms in Uganda to the cornfields of Iowa, the film discusses the emotions and the science behind food production. It follows specific cases amongst local legislation within the United States and in Africa, addressing how misinformation and fear can overwhelm objective analysis. Topics in the film range from: food safety, environmental protection, population demand, pesticide use, and general health surrounding GMOs. Through each topic, the film analyzes what data, evidence and sources are being used to argue one way or the other. People featured in the film, in order of appearance, include Margaret Wille, Jeffrey Smith, Charles Benbrook, Dennis Gonsalves, Alison Van Eenennaam, Pamela Ronald, Nathanael Johnson, Emma Naluyima, Mark Lynas, Zen Honeycut, and Raoul Adamchak. It also features interviews from Michael Pollan, Andrew Kimbrell, Vandana Shiva, Robert Fraley, Marion Nestle and Bill Nye, as well as farmers and scientists from around the world.

== Production ==
Prior to production, the Food Evolution producers conducted over 100 Skype interviews with experts in food, science, agriculture, and activism. After thorough research, filming began around the world, from Hawaii to Kenya, with Larkin Donley as cinematographer. Editors included Alex Blatt, Scott D. Hanson, and Scott Hamilton Kennedy with music by William Kingswood.

== Premiere ==
The film first premiered at the IFC Center in Greenwich Village for the Doc NYC festival on November 12, 2016.

== Reception ==
The film was critically very well-received. It has an approval rating of 100% on review aggregator website Rotten Tomatoes, with an average rating of 7.5/10 by top critics.

Kenneth Turan of The Los Angeles Times describes the film as, "the unusual issue film that deals in counterintuitive reason rather than barely controlled hysteria." Serena Donadoni of LA Weekly referred to it as a, "scrupulous, optimistic documentary" describing, "the new reality for American scientists: the challenge of reaching a public bombarded by conspiracy theories and fear mongering." John DeFore of the Hollywood Reporter said of the film that it is "A polished and provocative call for activists to be as scientifically minded as they believe they are."

Daniel Gold of The New York Times said, "With a soft tone, respectful to opponents but insistent on the data, "Food Evolution" posits an inconvenient truth for organic boosters to swallow: In a world desperate for safe, sustainable food, G.M.O.s may well be a force for good." It was also chosen as a Critic’s pick by The New York Times and has screened in over 200 locations around the globe as of July 2018.
