= Naluyima =

Naluyima is a surname. Notable people with the surname include:

- Betty Ethel Naluyima, Ugandan politician
- Emma Naluyima (born c. 1980), Ugandan veterinarian, urban farmer, businesswoman
