= South Central Farm =

Former urban farm in Los Angeles

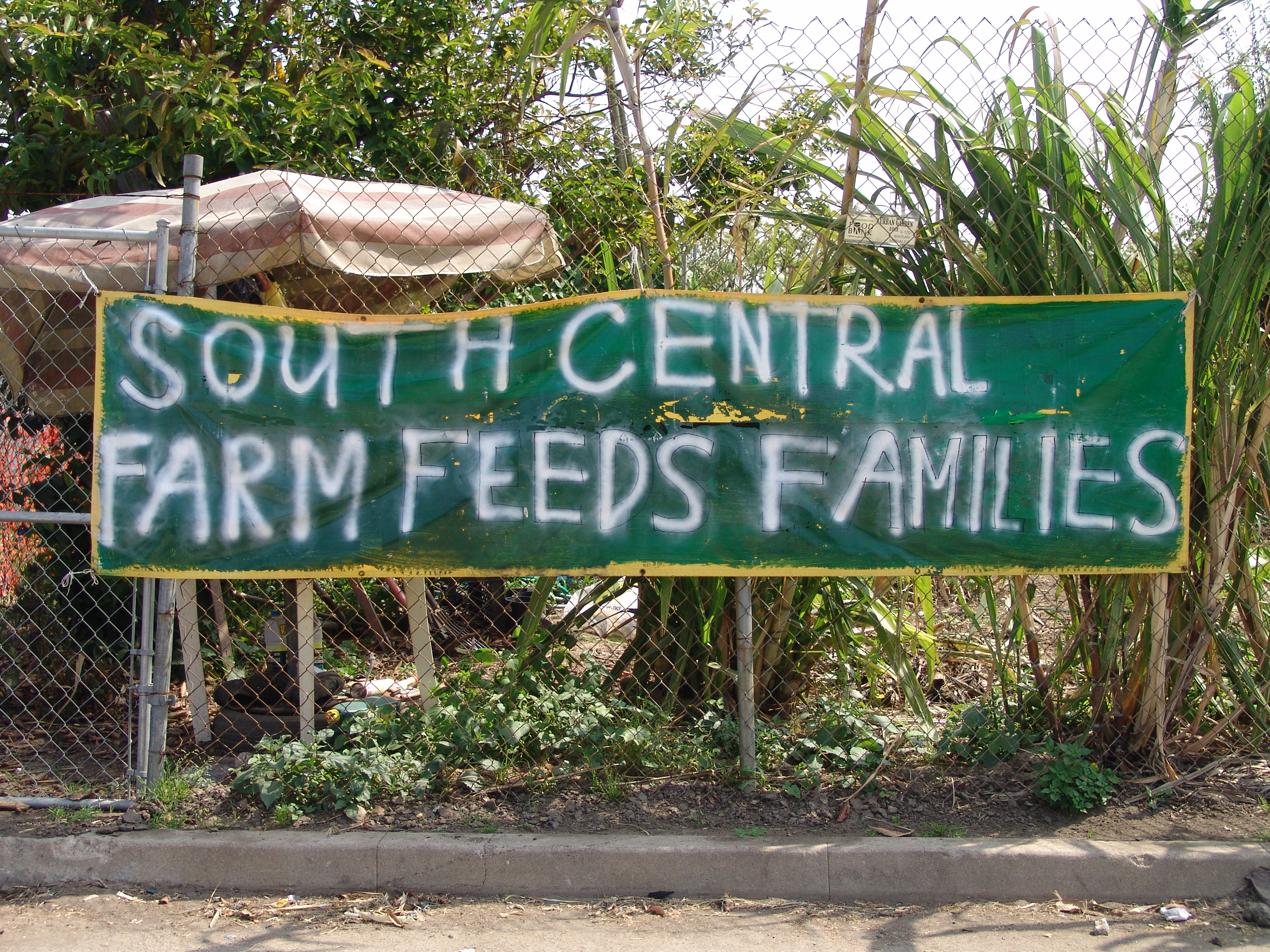
A banner on the fence surrounding the former grounds of the South Central Farm

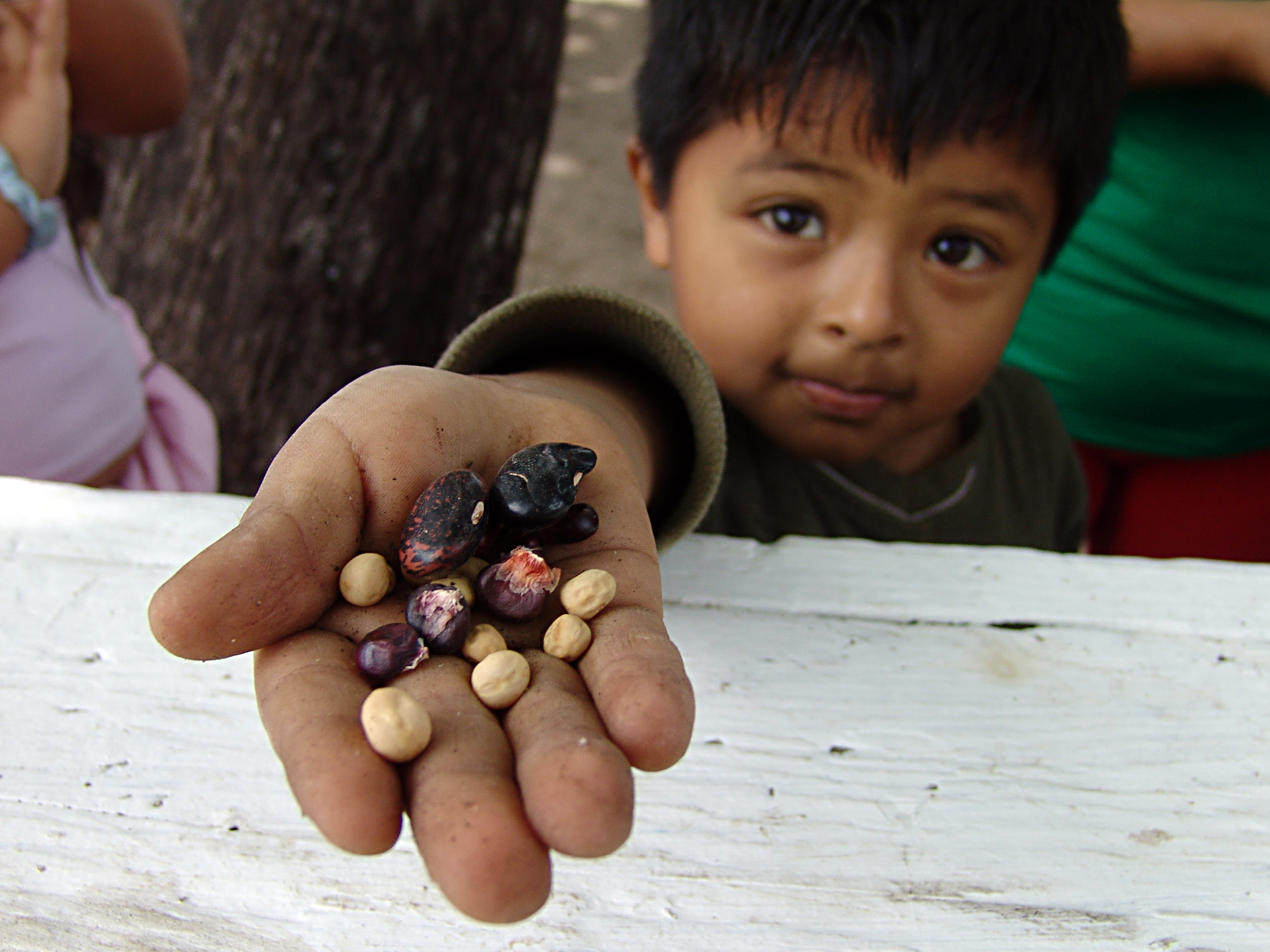
The son of a farmer holding seeds

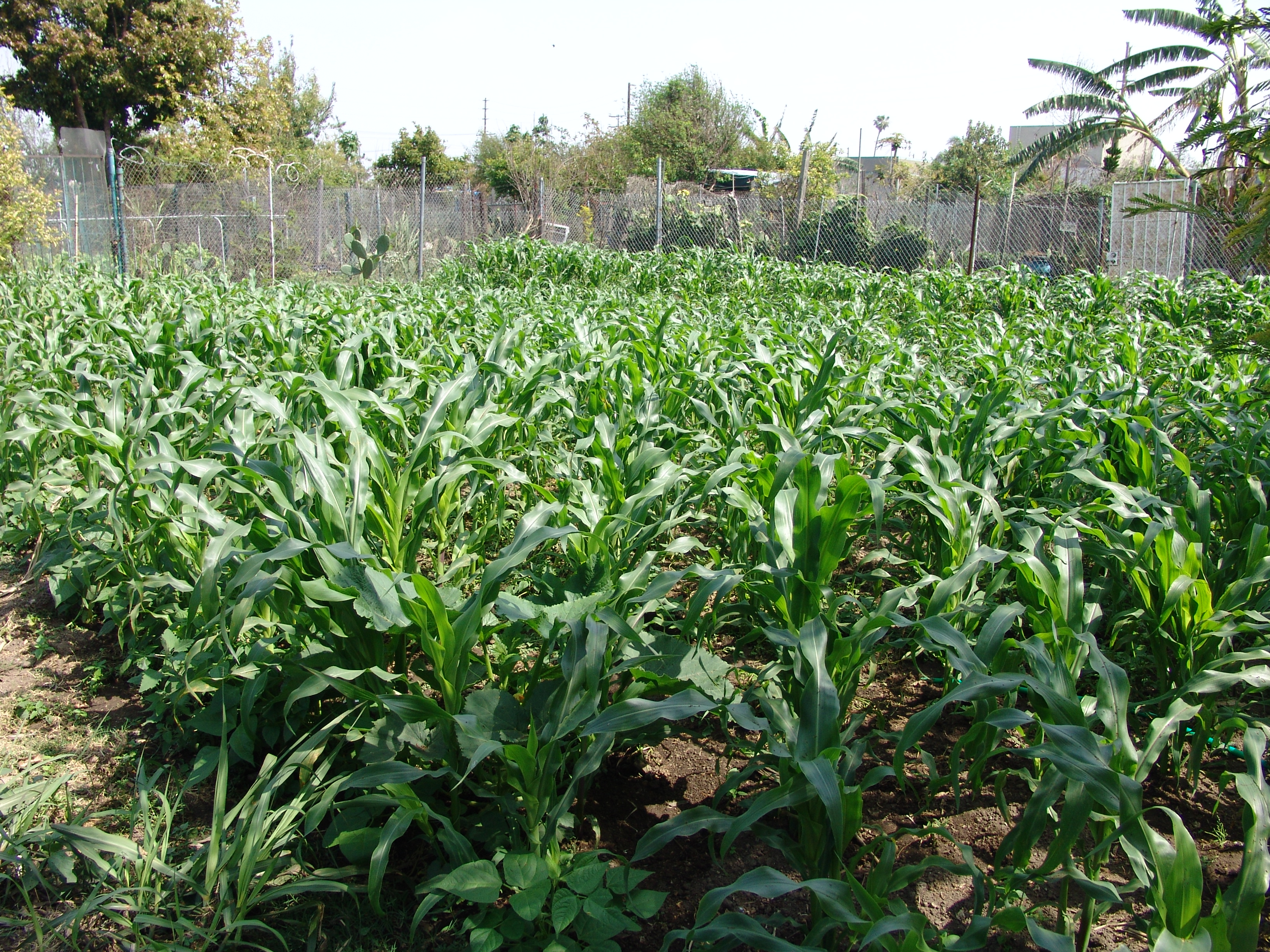
Crops at South Central Farm

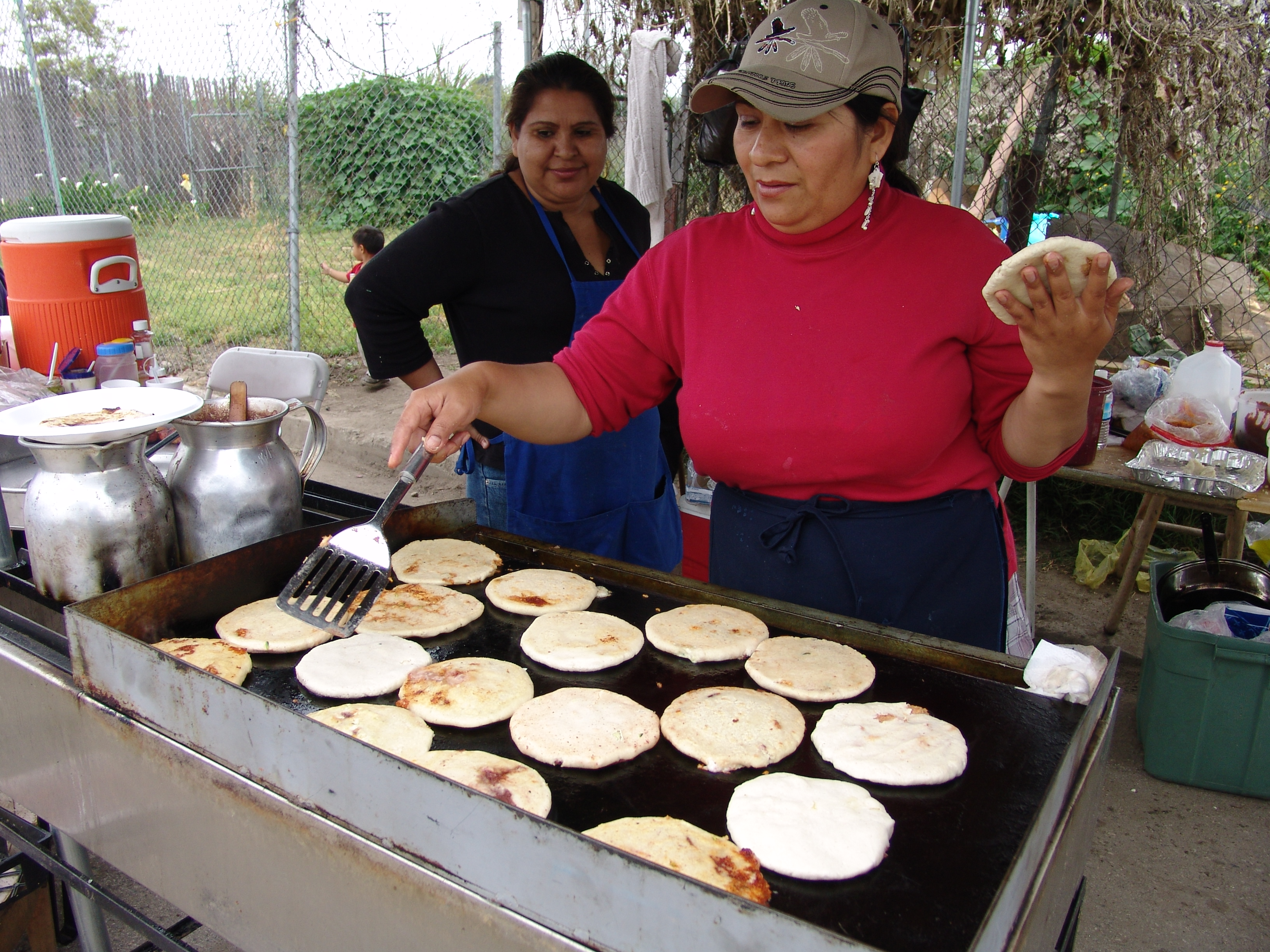
Kitchen at the farm

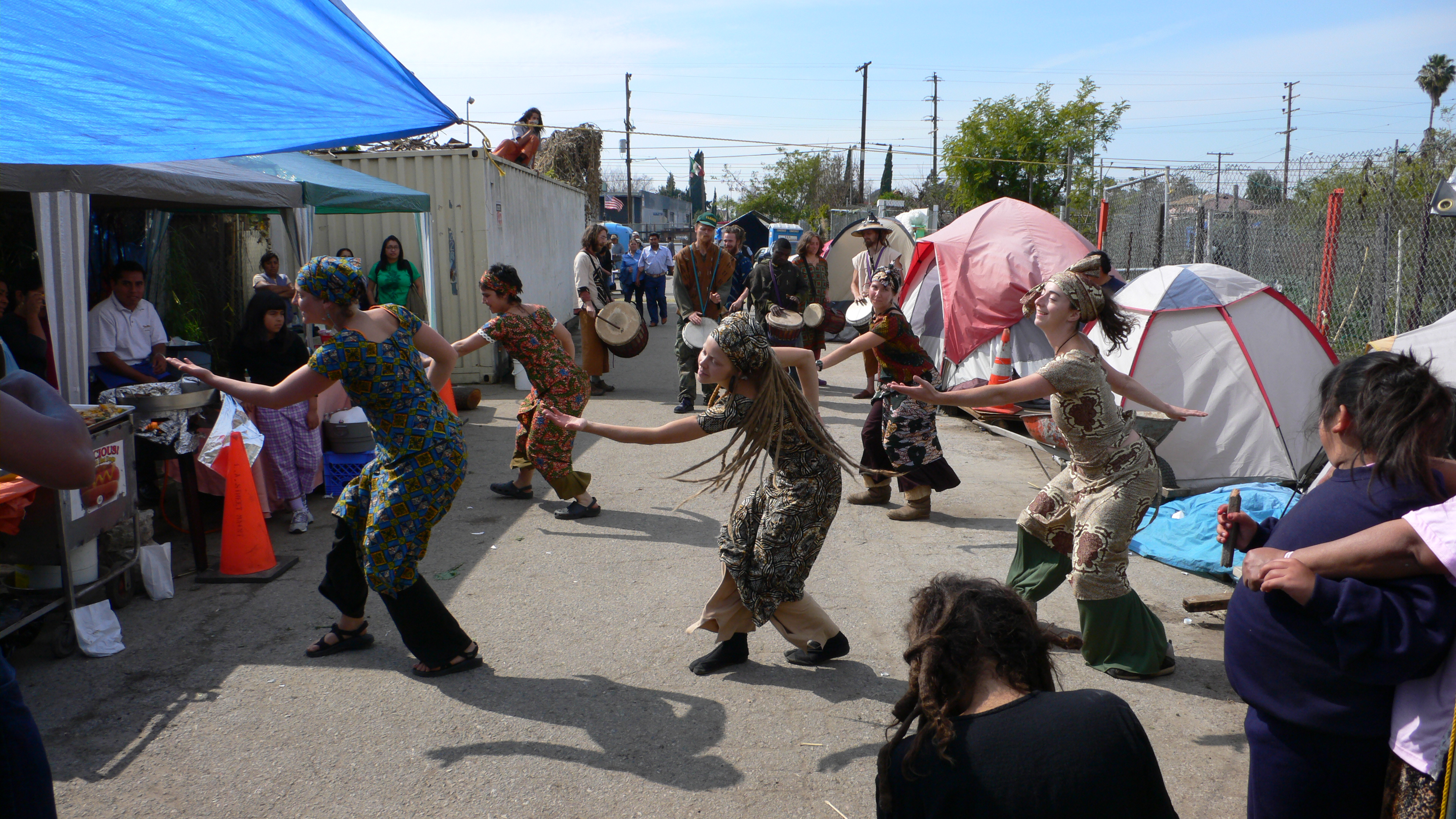
Dance performance at South Central Farm

The South Central Farm, also known as the South Central Community Garden, was an urban farm and community garden located at East 41st and South Alameda Streets, in an industrial area of South Los Angeles, California, (known as South Central Los Angeles) which was in operation between 1994 and 2006. At 14 acres (5.7 ha), it was considered one of the largest urban farms in the United States. The farm was sold in 2004, and the farmers were evicted in 2006. On July 5, 2006, workers began bulldozing the farm amidst strong protest and acts of civil disobedience. The farmers disputed the validity of the sale in court and staged vigils in protest. The farm is the subject of the 2008 Academy Award-nominated documentary film The Garden and the PBS documentary, South Central Farm, Oasis in a Concrete Desert.

== History ==
Before the creation of the garden, the land belonged to nine different owners, the largest of which was Alameda-Barbara Investment Company, a real-estate firm which purchased its share in 1980. The company held 80% of the property that would become the urban garden. The City of Los Angeles acquired the land by eminent domain in 1986, for the purpose of building a waste-to-energy facility known as the Los Angeles City Energy Recovery Project (LANCER). The city paid $4,786,372 for the property. After Concerned Citizens of South Central Los Angeles, led by Juanita Tate, stopped the project in 1987, the land lay fallow.

The City sold the property to the L.A. Harbor Department in 1994 for use with the development of the Alameda Corridor. In July 1994 the Harbor Department granted a revocable permit to the L.A. Regional Food Bank – a private, nonprofit food-distribution network housed across the street from the site – to occupy and use the site as a community garden.

The final order of condemnation under eminent domain included a right to repurchase the land for the largest landowner, Alameda-Barbara Investment Company, should the city sell it for non-public or non-housing purposes within ten years of the condemnation. In 2001, Ralph Horowitz, a partner in Alameda-Barbara sued the City for breach of contract, for failure to honor the original right of repurchase. The City denied his claim.

In 2003, the City of L.A. settled with Horowitz, in a closed-door session. The sale was for $5,050,000 which was slightly above the $4.8 million the City had paid for it in the eminent domain seizure. The settlement was done to comply with the repurchase clause as the court had mandated. Horowitz agreed to donate 2.6 acres (11,000 m^{2}) of the site, valued at nearly $3,000,000, for a public soccer field, as part of the settlement. The City Council discussed and approved the terms of the settlement in closed session. The South Central Farm's lawyer, Patrick Dunlevy, claims that despite repeated requests, negotiation documents relating to the session have never been released.

Shortly thereafter the project was abandoned. In response the farmers formed an organization calling themselves the 'South Central Farmers Feeding Families'.

On January 8, 2004, Horowitz issued a notice to the gardeners setting February 29, 2004, as the termination date for the community garden. In response members of the South Central Farmers Feeding Families obtained legal counsel (Hadsell & Stormer, Inc., and Kaye, Mclane & Bednarski LLP) and filed a lawsuit seeking to invalidate the sale of the property. The Los Angeles County Superior Court issued a temporary restraining order and later a preliminary injunction halting development of the property until the lawsuit could be settled. The farmers lost the lawsuit and the court dissolved the injunction, freeing Horowitz to evict the farmers.

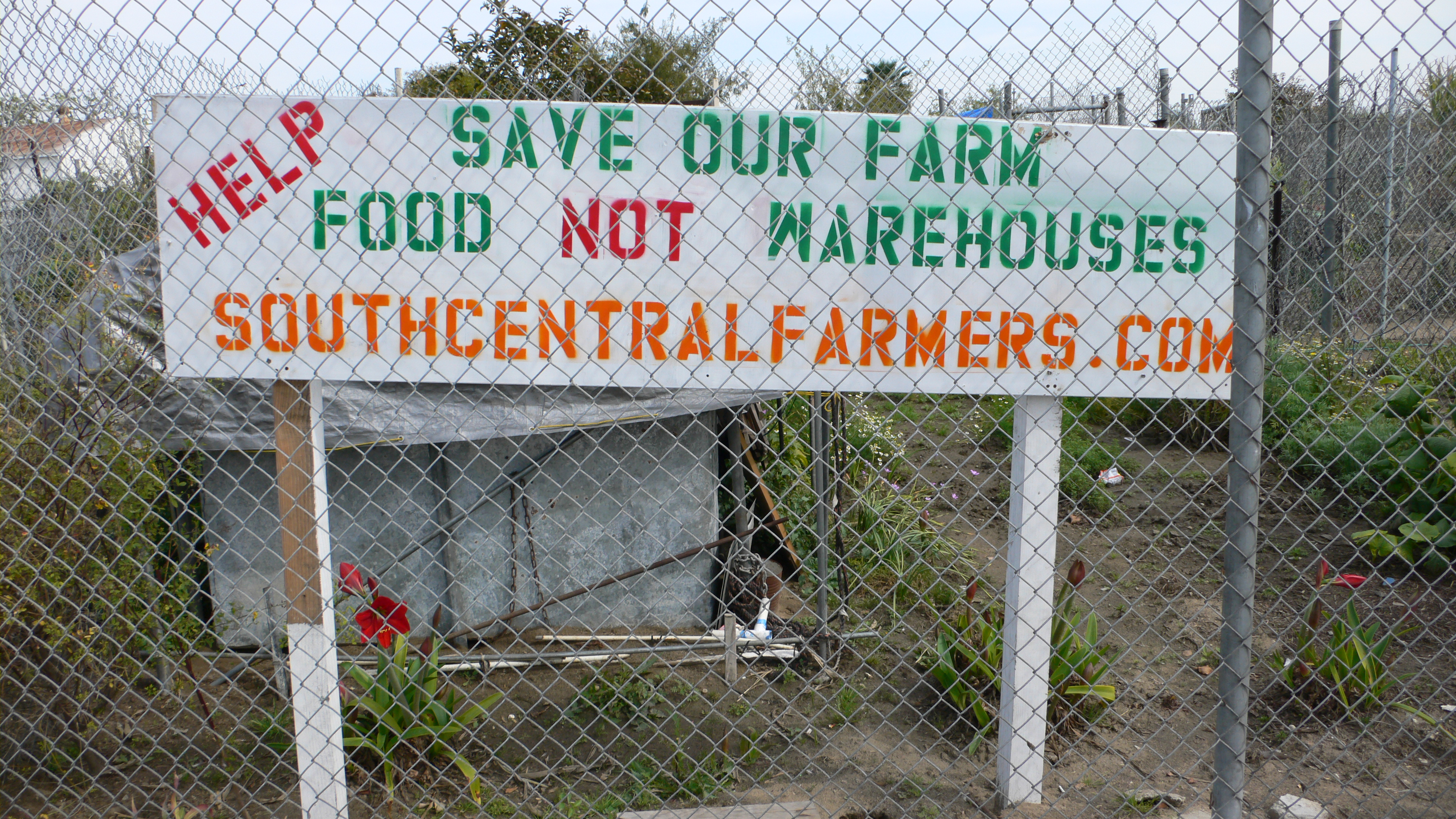
A sign at the fenceline of South Central Farm

Initially, Horowitz sought $16.3 million for the property, more than three times the 1986 eminent domain valuation. In a deal brokered in cooperation by The Trust for Public Land, the SCF successfully raised a little over $6 million. Fundraising efforts continued as farmers and celebrities began both a tree-sitting campaign and occupation of the land, while under the threat of forced eviction by the Los Angeles County Sheriff's Department.

On June 7, 2006, the Annenberg Foundation announced that they would donate the money to buy the farm. Horowitz, however, did not respond to the offer, since it came after his May 22 deadline.

At 3 a.m. on the morning of June 13, 2006, the Los Angeles County Sheriff's Department arrived at the farm, fully surrounding it by 4 a.m. At 5 a.m., the sheriffs entered the farm, giving the occupants 15 minutes to evacuate. At that point, most of the occupants of the land left, with a few verbal skirmishes reported. According to the Los Angeles Times, more than 40 protesters were arrested. Actress Daryl Hannah was removed from the walnut tree in which she and another tree-sitter had been protesting the eviction and was arrested.

In June 2006, the farm was protected by a private security company hired by Horowitz to prevent members of the South Central Farm returning to squat on the land. Horowitz told the Los Angeles Times and KFI that he would not sell the land to them even if they offered him $100 million, because of the picketing of his house and anti-Semitic remarks directed towards him.

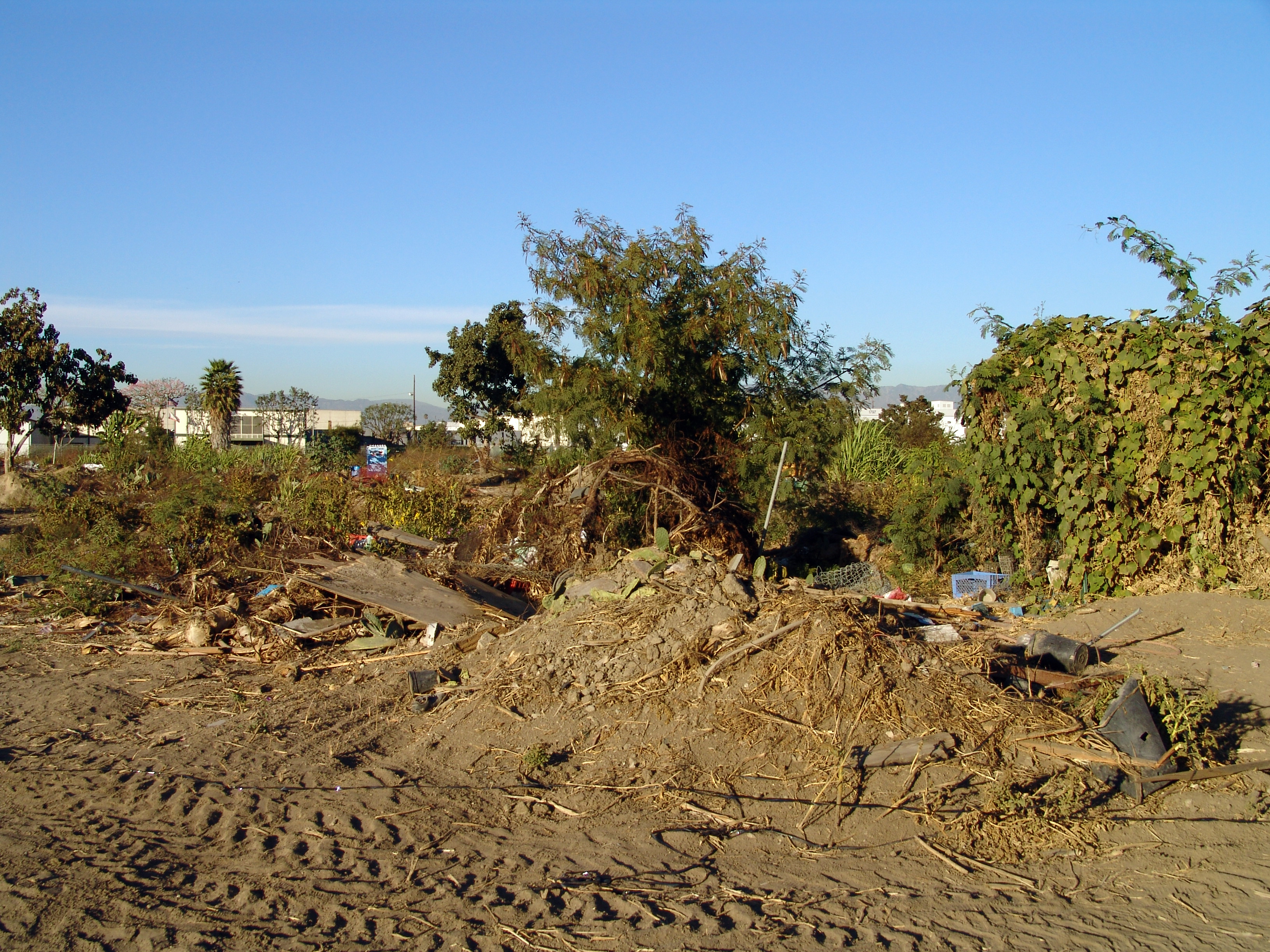
South Central Farm a few months after it was bulldozed

On July 5, 2006, workers began bulldozing the farm amidst protest and acts of civil disobedience. One protester chained himself to a bulldozer and another lay down in front of a bulldozer. Both were arrested. Two others were also arrested, one for throwing a milk crate at a police officer and the other for assaulting a bulldozer driver. Ten people were arrested in total.

On July 12, 2006, Judge Helen I. Bendix heard pre-trial arguments in a class-action suit filed by the farmers that the sale of the land to Horowitz "should be nullified on grounds that there was no prior public notice" of the transaction. The farmers' arguments were rejected on July 27, 2006 when Judge Bendix upheld the sale of the land to Horowitz. Dan Stormer, the attorney for the plaintiffs, said he would appeal.

As of September 2008, Horowitz and Forever 21 were working on a proposal for a warehouse and distribution center on the now-bulldozed site.

As of June 2011, the land remained an empty lot. In 2022, the city approved a project including warehouses and offices for the site.

== Relocation ==
The City of Los Angeles provided 7.8 acres (3.2 ha) of land at an alternate site, which some of the farmers have relocated to and begun cultivating. The site at 111th Street and Avalon Boulevard has the capacity to hold 200 garden plots. The city also identified 100 other plots for community gardens according to the Mayor Antonio Villaraigosa.

A few organizations stemmed out from this farm, including the South Central Farmers' Health and Education Fund and South Central Farmers' LLC. The mission of these organizations is to provide healthy, organic, affordable produce and snacks. Acquiring land in Buttonwillow, California and Lake Hughes, California, the farmers make nutritious organic food available for several farmers' markets. A group of farmers who were originally at the 41st and Alameda farm continue to provide healthy foods for families in impoverished neighborhoods.

== Plant life ==
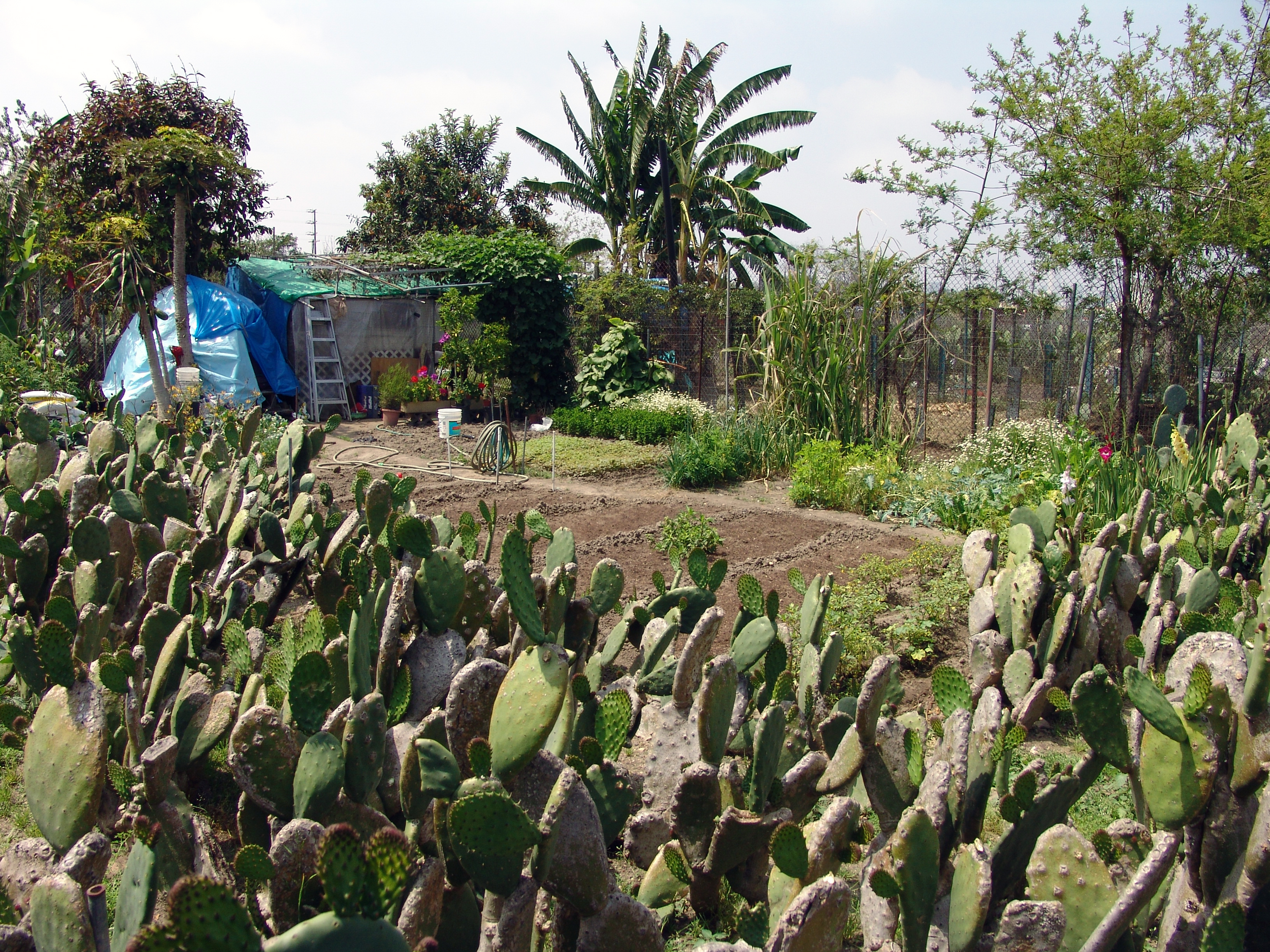
One of many cactus patches that served as natural fencing and food

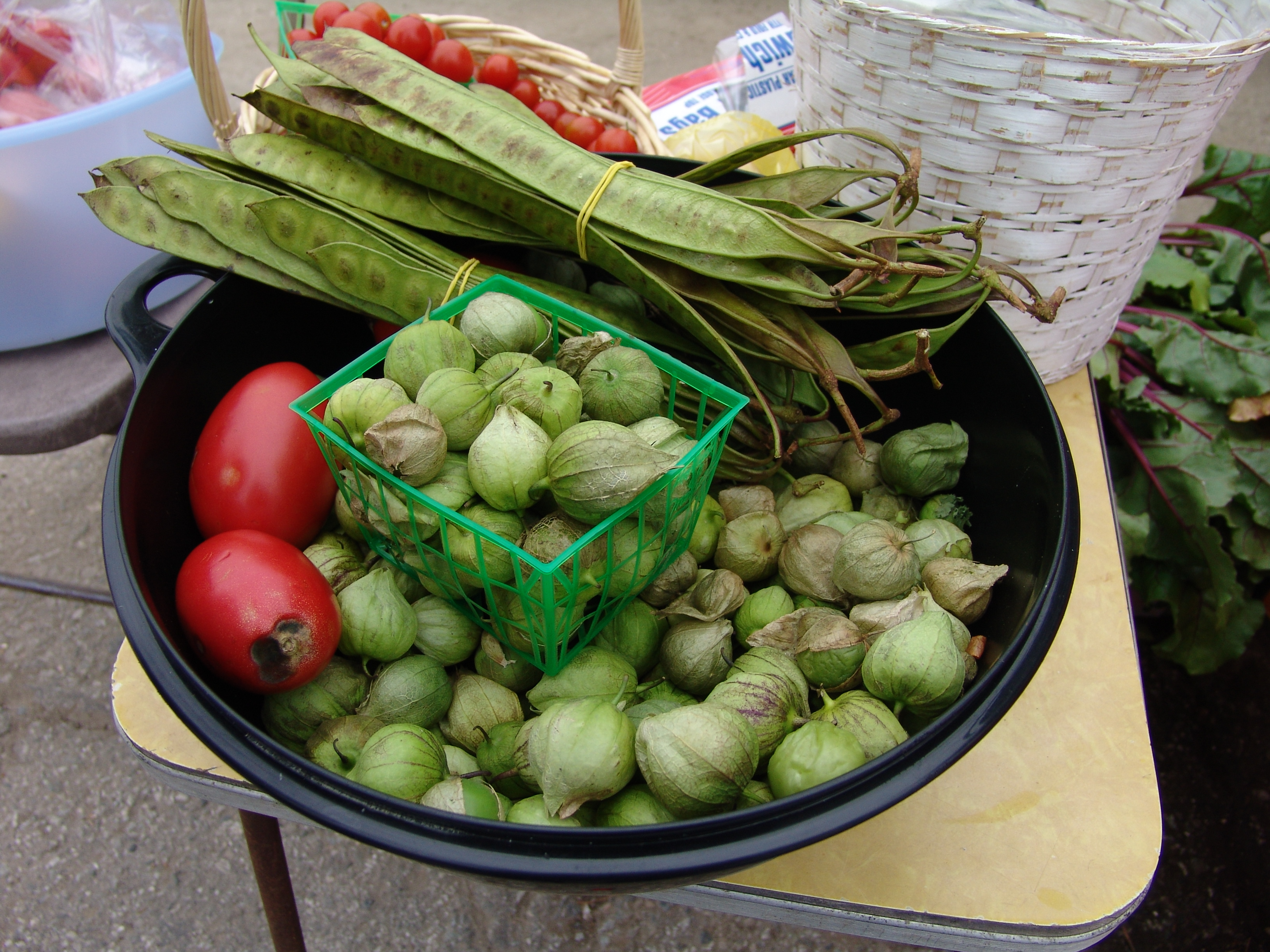
Different varieties of tomatillos and beans were often for sale at the Sunday farmers' market at the Farm

The SCF held an estimated 100 to 150 species of plants, 37 of which have been identified by Devon G. Peña, professor of anthropology at the Acequia Institute of the University of Washington. According to Peña, the inventory of plants present at the farm represent its connection to "Mega-Mexico", a Vavilov Center and one of the original anthropological locations where plants were domesticated. This Vavilov center stretches from the southern end of Mexico (Chiapas) up to the Southwestern United States. Some of the plants present have been reintroduced to the area by the farmers, descendants of the original inhabitants of Mesoamerica. The relationship between traditional farmers and their plants is not like the relationship between modern farmers and their crops. Many plants that are seen as weeds by modern farmers have multiple uses to traditional farmers. Similar to dandelion, wood sorrel and clover which may be used as salad ingredients, these plants function as crops, herbal medicine, spiritual use, and as companion plants.

- Avocado
- Banana
- Bean
- Butterfly plant
- Nopal (Opuntia ficus-indica)
- Calabash
- Disc mayweed (Matricaria discoidea)
- Roman chamomile (Anthemis nobilis)
- Chayote (Sechium edule)
- Chipilín (Crotalaria longirostrata)
- Chokecherry (Prunus virginiana var. demissa)
- Dwarf nettle (Urtica urens)
- Floss silk tree (Ceiba speciosa)
- Green amaranth (Amaranthus viridis)
- Guava (Psidium guajava)
- Tomatillo (Physalis philadelphica)
- Jimsonweed (Datura stramonium)
- Maize
- Malabar gourd
- Common Mallow (Malva sylvestris)
- Mexican honeysuckle (Justicia spicigera)
- Cilantro (Coriandrum sativum)
- Pericón (Tagetes lucida)
- Mexican Wild Yam
- Pennyroyal (Mentha pulegium)
- Pipicha (Porophyllum tagetoides)
- Common Purslane (Portulaca oleracea)
- Pot marigold (Calendula officinalis)
- Huanzontlec (Chenopodium berlandieri)
- Hoja santa (Piper auritum)
- Rose
- Sapodilla
- Seepweed
- White sagebrush (Artemisia ludoviciana)
- Chinese tallow (Triadica sebifera)
- Snake Plant (Sansevieria trifasciata)
- Spurred anoda (Anoda cristata)
- Succulents
- Sugarcane
- Tomato
- Epazote (Dysphania ambrosioides)
- Wormwood
- Yerba mora (Solanum americanum)
- Walnut

== Farmers ==
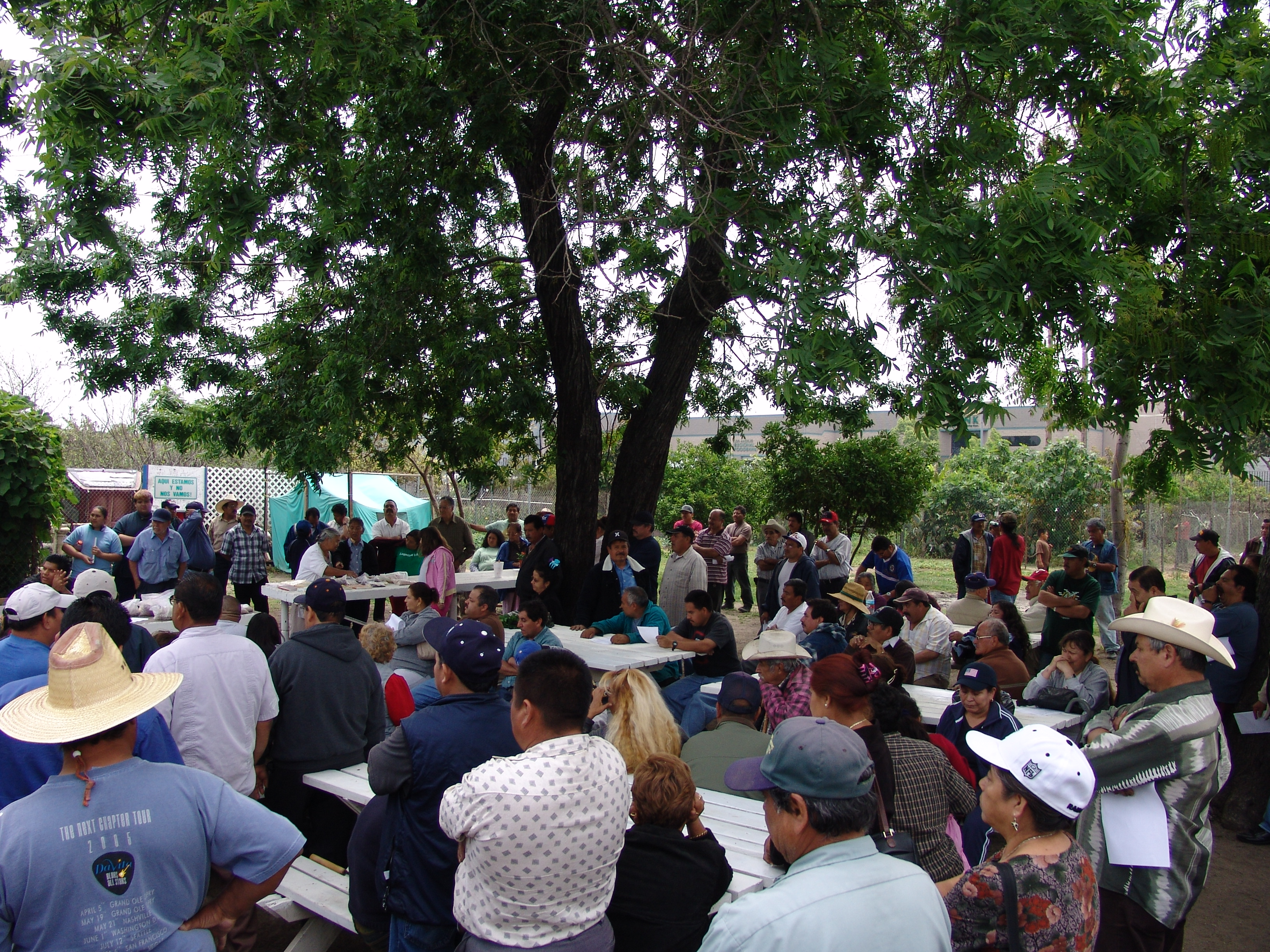
South Central Farmers at their general meeting

The South Central Farmers consist of approximately 350 families of moderate means from the neighboring community. They are a self-governing organization. This group transformed the property from a junk-filled space into one of the largest urban gardens. Since the notification of the impending destruction of the garden, the group became politically active and gathered supporters in politics, higher learning, entertainment, and abroad.

The operating framework of the SCF is made up of elected roles recruited from the General Assembly of the farmers. Some of these positions are publicly visible representatives of the SCF, such as Rufina Juarez and Tezozomoc. These two "voices" are often mistaken for the organization's leaders because they often need to interact with the outside public. All roles taken by members of the SCF exist solely to fulfill a need or set of needs to continue the healthy life span of the farm. On the farm women fulfilled most roles from accounting to that of lot monitors.

== In popular culture ==
The farm is the subject of the 2008 Academy Award-nominated documentary film The Garden. It was also the subject of the PBS documentary, with an AFI Film Festival Premiere, in the Natural Heroes Series, South Central Farm, Oasis in a Concrete Desert.

== Notable supporters ==
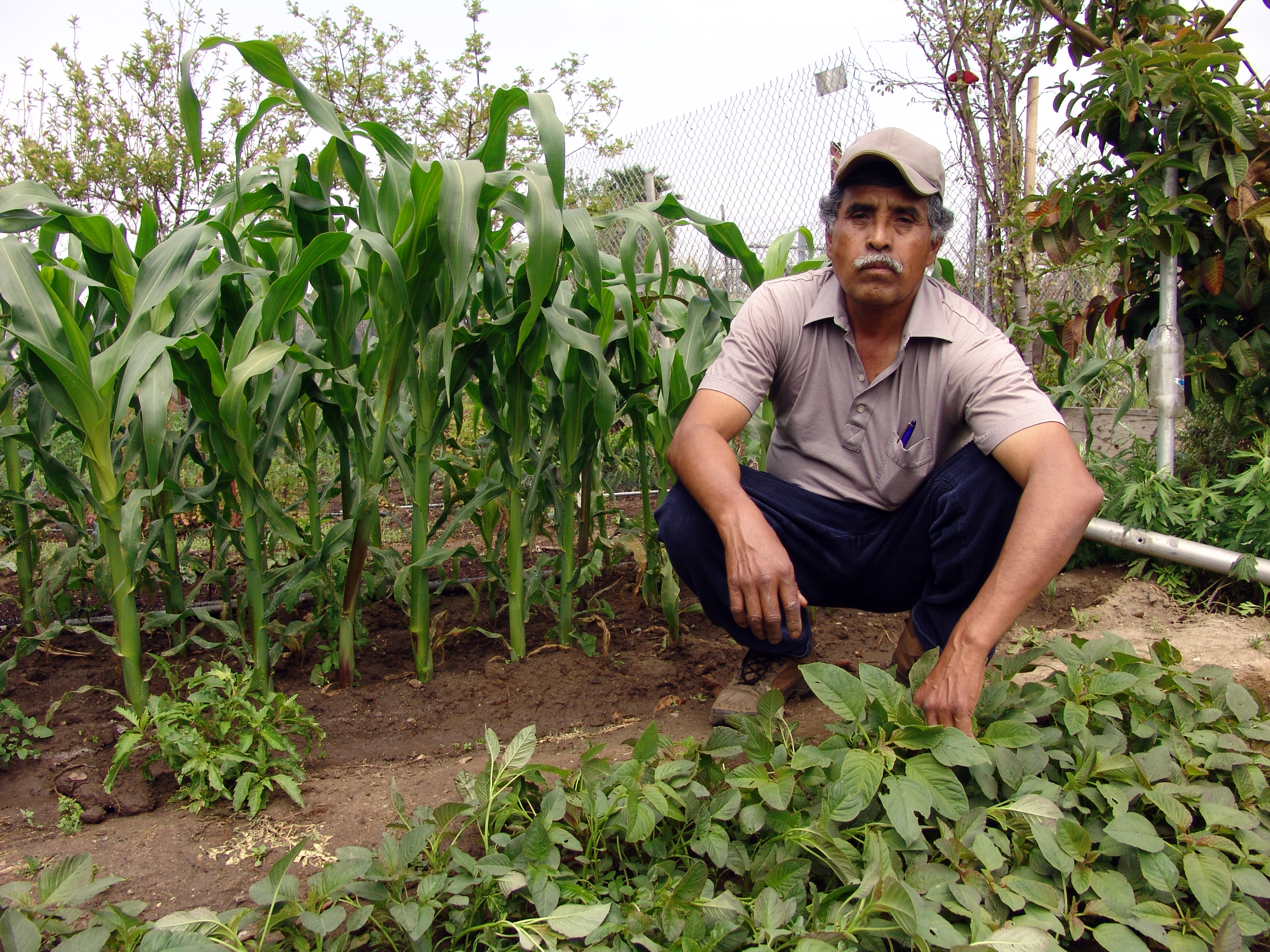
A participant at South Central Farm

- Joan Baez, activist and folk singer
- Michael 'Flea' Balzary, of the Red Hot Chili Peppers
- California Green Party
- James Cromwell
- Zack de la Rocha, lead singer of Rage Against the Machine
- Leonardo DiCaprio
- Danny Glover, actor
- Daryl Hannah, actress
- Ben Harper, singer and musician
- Julia Butterfly Hill, environmental activist
- Immortal Technique, rap artist
- Ron Kovic
- Dennis Kucinich
- Tom Morello, of Audioslave and Rage Against the Machine (As "The Nightwatchman")
- Ralph Nader, activist
- Willie Nelson, singer
- Ozomatli
- Mike Feinstein, former Santa Monica Mayor
- Alicia Silverstone, actress
- Amy Smart, actress
- Steven Murphy, activist

== Reactions ==
Owner Ralph Horowitz, a partner in both the Alameda-Barbara Investment Company and its current incarnation the Libaw-Horowitz Investment Company, maintained that his property rights were being denied by the farmers. He also claimed that the SCF is not an "open" organization, since the entire city cannot be members nor can all residents have access to farm on the land. Horowitz had proposed to build a soccer field for the community, built on a set-aside portion of 3 acres (12,000 m^{2}). The field was intended be accessible to all city residents, unlike the SCF. Horowitz stated that the use of the remaining portion of the property would be "market driven". He also stated that he would consider giving preference to a "quality tenant", alleging that anything that he does with the property will generate jobs in the community, unlike its use by the farmers. Horowitz also made the claim that the operation of the SCF was not fair since there was no cap on the number of years that a farmer may use his or her plot of land and there was also no need to make room for someone else; that the farmers simply wanted to keep the land forever.

Los Angeles Councilman Dennis P. Zine alleged that the SCF was a confrontational group, and Daniel Hernandez wrote an article about the SCF titled "Bushel of Complaints". Claims of internal corruption within the South Central Farm such as farmers being evicted for not supporting the actions of Juarez and Tezozomoc had also been made.

Activist Juanita Tate opposed the community farmers who wanted to keep the South Central Farm. She advocated the eviction of the farmers and the construction of a sports field in place of the community garden.

== See also ==
- Chávez Ravine
- Chicano Park
- Environmental racism
- Food security
- Urban agriculture
