= Alison Van Eenennaam =

American biologist

Alison L. Van Eenennaam
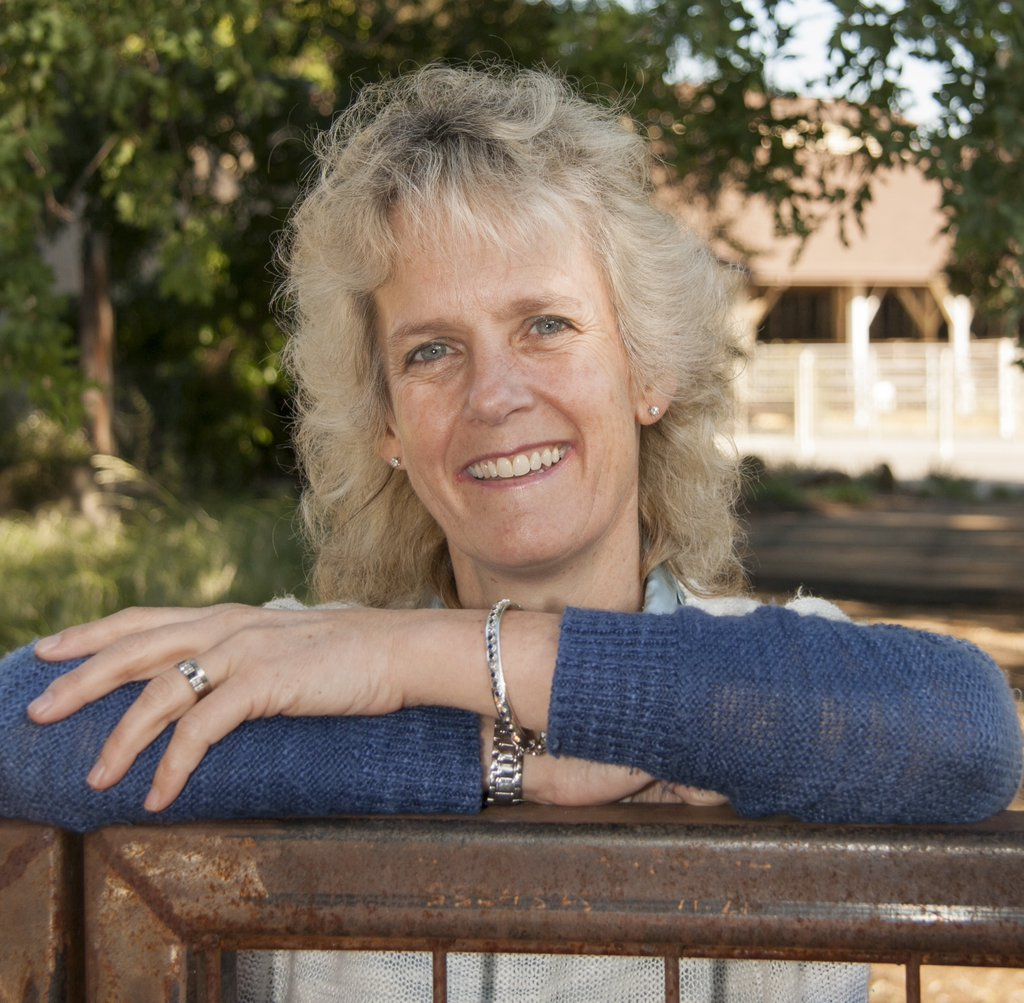
- Born: Melbourne, Australia
- Education: University of Melbourne (BS); University of California, Davis (MS, PhD)
- Known for: research on animal cloning and genetic engineering of livestock and science communication
- Spouse: Joel Van Eenennaam (1990–present)
- Children: 2
- Awards: National Award for Excellence in Extension from the American Association of Public and Land-Grant Universities (2010) and Borlaug CAST Communication Award (2014)
- Scientific career
- Fields: Animal Genomics; Biotechnology
- Institutions: University of California-Davis
- Website: animalbiotech.ucdavis.edu

Alison L. Van Eenennaam is a Cooperative Extension Specialist in the Department of Animal Science at the University of California, Davis and runs the Animal Genomics and Biotechnology Laboratory. She has served on national committees such as the USDA National Advisory Committee on Biotechnology in the 21st Century (AC21) and was awarded the 2014 Borlaug CAST Communication Award. Van Eenennaam writes the Biobeef Blog.

== Education ==
Van Eenennaam began her university career at the University of Melbourne, Victoria, Australia in 1987, receiving a BS (Honors) degree in Agricultural Science. She received a Master of Science degree in Animal Science in 1990, and a Ph.D. in genetics in 1997, both from University of California, Davis.

== Career ==
Van Eenennaam began her work in animal science as an intern at Genetic Resources Inc.'s Bovine Reproduction Facility in San Marcos, Texas in 1984. From 1991 to 1993 she worked as a livestock and dairy farm advisor for the UC Cooperative Extension in the San Joaquin and Sacramento Counties of California. From 1998 to 2002, following the completion of her Ph.D. degree, Van Eenennaam worked for Calgene (purchased by Monsanto Corporation in 1997) in Davis, California, first as a research scientist, and then as a project leader. Since 2002, Van Eenennaam has been a Cooperative Extension Specialist in the field of Animal Genomics and Biotechnology in the Department of Animal Science at University of California, Davis.

She has served on several national committees including the USDA National Advisory Committee on Biotechnology and 21st Century Agriculture, (2005–2009), and was a temporary voting member of the 2010 FDA Veterinary Medicine Advisory Committee meeting on the AquAdvantage salmon, the first genetically engineered animal to be evaluated for entry into the food supply.

== Research ==
The mission of Van Eenennaam's animal biotechnology lab is to "provide research and education on the use of animal genomics and biotechnology in livestock production systems", with a focus on beef cattle production. Van Eenennaam's biotechnology lab at UC Davis is working on a collaborative project focused on the production of hornless dairy cattle through gene editing on a USDA National Institute of Food and Agriculture grant. This project involves using a gene sequence from Angus cattle in the genome of dairy cattle to prevent horns from growing. Van Eenennaam stated that the use of genetics rather than chemicals to solve problems can address some of the animal welfare concerns and environmental impacts of animal production. In October, 2016, this project was featured on Science Friday. Funding sources for this research and extension program are found on Van Eenennaam's public website.

Van Eenennaam was appointed to the Food and Drug Administration Veterinary Medicine Advisory Committee evaluating the AquAdvantage salmon, a genetically engineered fish. A paper, authored in 2006 by Van Eenennaam with Paul Olin of University of California Cooperative Extension Sea Grant, discussed transgenic fish. The paper cites a number of benefits of genetically engineered fish, including a larger number of eggs laid per female, a low probability of carrying human pathogens, strong markets for aquaculture, and increased feed-conversion efficiency. This paper also describes the risk factor that these fish could escape breeding locations and mix with wild fish populations.

In 2014 Van Eenennaam co-authored a review article on the use of genetically modified feed for cattle. The data represented more than 100 billion animals in 29 studies and found "GMO feed is safe and nutritionally equivalent to non-GMO feed".

== Science outreach ==
Van Eenennaam won two awards from American Society of Animal Science. One was for the 2013 video Gene Shop, a five-minute parody of Macklemore’s “Thrift Shop” in which Dr. Van Eenennaam and UC Davis students engagingly emphasize the importance of funding for agricultural research. The second award was for the 2012 video Were Those the Days My friend?, a take on a ballad from the 1960s that highlights the importance of genetic advances for improved production efficiency and food security. This competition was designed to further the "goal of sharing the importance of animal science with the public".

Additional YouTube videos on biotechnology topics are linked to the BioBeef Blog written by Van Eenennaam in order "to try to interject scientific nuance into these controversial and often politicized scientific topics". Van Eenennaam participated in the 2014 Intelligence Squared debate on the topic of genetically modify food.

In 2014, Van Eenennaam was awarded the Borlaug CAST Communication Award by the Council for Agricultural Science and Technology (CAST), named after agricultural biologist and 1970 Nobel Peace Prize winner Norman Borlaug. CAST indicated that Van Eenennaam is known for her communication skills and praised for her understanding of biotechnology, her enthusiasm for agricultural education, and her abilities to use novel ideas to get important messages to policymakers and the public alike.

Van Eenennaam appeared in the 2016 documentary production, Food Evolution, written and produced by Trace Sheehan and Scott Hamilton Kennedy. The film, narrated by Neil deGrasse Tyson, features scientific experts in the areas of genetics, biology, biotechnology, and nutrition, as well as farmers and activists discussing the problems of feeding a growing global population.

== Awards ==
- 2005 The Communicator “Award of Distinction” for “Genetic Engineering in California Agriculture” video.
- 2009 The Communicator “Award of Distinction” for “Animal Biotechnology” video production
- 2010 American Association of Public and Land-Grant Universities (APLU), 2010 National Award for Excellence in Extension
- 2014 American Society of Animal Science Extension Award
- 2014 Council for Agricultural Science and Technology (CAST) Borlaug Communication Award
- 2016 Beef Improvement Federation (BIF) Continuing Service Award
- 2016 BIO 2016 Future Maker Award
- 2017 American Association for the Advancement of Science Fellow - Section on Agriculture, Food, and Renewable Resources
- 2021 Beef Improvement Federation Pioneer Award

== Articles ==
Van Eenennaam has authored or co-authored more than 80 academic articles. The following are selected articles in which Van Eenennaam is listed as the lead author.

- Van Eenennaam, A. L; Van Der Werf, J. H. J; Goddard, M. E (2011). "The value of using DNA markers for beef bull selection in the seedstock sector". Journal of Animal Science. 89 (2): 307–20. doi:10.2527/jas.2010-3223. PMID 21262975.
- Van Eenennaam, A. L. E. M. Hallerman, and W.M. Muir. 2011. The Science and Regulation of Food from Genetically Engineered Animals. Council for Agricultural Science and Technology (CAST) Commentary QTA2011-2. CAST, Ames, Iowa.
- Van Eenennaam, Alison L; Muir, William M (2011). "Transgenic salmon: A final leap to the grocery shelf?". Nature Biotechnology. 29 (8): 706–10. doi:10.1038/nbt.1938. PMID 21822244. S2CID 205275929.
- Van Eenennaam, Alison L; Drake, Daniel J (2012). "Where in the beef-cattle supply chain might DNA tests generate value?". Animal Production Science. 52 (3): 185–96. doi:10.1071/AN11060.
- Van Eenennaam, A.L.; Muir, W. M.; Hallerman, E. A. (July 24, 2013). "Is Unaccountable Regulatory Delay and Political Interference Undermining the FDA and Hurting American Competitiveness? A Response to Tim Schwab's 'Is FDA Ready to Regulate the World's First Biotech Food Animal'?" (PDF). The Food and Drug Law Institute (FDLI) Food and Drug Policy Forum. 3 (12).
- Van Eenennaam, Alison L (2013). "GMOs in animal agriculture: Time to consider both costs and benefits in regulatory evaluations". Journal of Animal Science and Biotechnology. 4 (1) 37. doi:10.1186/2049-1891-4-37. PMC 4015968. PMID 24066781.
- Van Eenennaam, Alison L; Weigel, Kent A; Young, Amy E; Cleveland, Matthew A; Dekkers, Jack C.M (2014). "Applied Animal Genomics: Results from the Field". Annual Review of Animal Biosciences. 2: 105–39. doi:10.1146/annurev-animal-022513-114119. PMID 25384137.
- Van Eenennaam, A. L; Weber, K. L; Drake, D. J (2014). "Evaluation of bull prolificacy on commercial beef cattle ranches using DNA paternity analysis12". Journal of Animal Science. 92 (6): 2693–701. doi:10.2527/jas.2013-7217. PMID 24753384.
- Van Eenennaam, A.L., B.M. Chassy, N. Kalaitzandonakes, and T.P. Redick. 2014. The Potential Impacts of Mandatory Labeling for Genetically Engineered Food in the United States. Issue Paper 54. Council for Agricultural Science and Technology (CAST). Ames, Iowa.
- Van Eenennaam, A. L; Young, A. E (2014). "Erratum". Journal of Animal Science. 92 (11): 4255–78. doi:10.2527/jas.2014-8124. PMID 25184846.
- Van Eenennaam, Alison; Neibergs, Holly; Seabury, Christopher; Taylor, Jeremy; Wang, Zeping; Scraggs, Erik; Schnabel, Robert D; Decker, Jared; Wojtowicz, Andrzej; Aly, Sharif; Davis, Jessica; Blanchard, Patricia; Crossley, Beate; Rossitto, Paul; Lehenbauer, Terry; Hagevoort, Robert; Chavez, Erik; Neibergs, J. Shannon; Womack, James E (2014). "Results of the BRD CAP project: Progress toward identifying genetic markers associated with BRD susceptibility". Animal Health Research Reviews. 15 (2): 157–60. doi:10.1017/S1466252314000231. PMID 25384903. S2CID 25759741.
- Van Eenennaam, Alison L; Young, Amy E (2015). "Animal agriculture and the importance of agnostic governance of biotechnology". Agriculture & Food Security. 4 (1): 21. Bibcode:2015AgFS....4...21V. doi:10.1186/s40066-015-0043-3.
- Van Eenennaam, Alison Louise (2017). "Genetic modification of food animals". Current Opinion in Biotechnology. 44: 27–34. doi:10.1016/j.copbio.2016.10.007. PMID 27835795.
- Van Eenennaam, A. L; Young, A. E (2017). "Detection of dietary DNA, protein, and glyphosate in meat, milk, and eggs1". Journal of Animal Science. 95 (7): 3247–3269. doi:10.2527/jas.2016.1346. PMID 28727079.
