= The Garden (2008 film) =

2008 documentary film by Scott Hamilton Kennedy

- Promotional film poster
- Directed by: Scott Hamilton Kennedy
- Written by: Scott Hamilton Kennedy
- Cinematography: Scott Hamilton Kennedy
- Edited by: Alex Blatt; Tyson FitzGerald; Scott Hamilton Kennedy
- Music by: Doug DeAngelis; Gabriel Tenorio
- Production company: Black Valley Films
- Distributed by: Oscilloscope Laboratories
- Release date: June 18, 2008
- Running time: 80 minutes
- Country: United States
- Language: English / Spanish

The Garden is a 2008 American documentary film directed by Scott Hamilton Kennedy. It tells the story of the now demolished South Central Farm; a community garden and urban farm located in Los Angeles, California. The Garden details the plight of the South Central Farmers, a mostly Latin community of farmers who organized and worked on the farm. After a suspected back room deal, the land upon which the farm operated was sold from the city back to the original owner, Ralph Horowitz. He then decided he did not want to allow the farmers to use it anymore. Despite efforts to keep their farm, the South Central Farmers were evicted and their garden was bulldozed. The film was nominated for an Academy Award for Best Documentary Feature on 22 January 2008.

The Garden includes appearances by Danny Glover, Daryl Hannah, and Antonio Villaraigosa.

== Reception ==
=== Critical response ===
The Garden has an approval rating of 79% on review aggregator website Rotten Tomatoes, based on 24 reviews, and an average rating of 6.95/10.

=== Awards ===
The Garden was nominated for Best Documentary Feature in the 81st Academy Awards.

The International Documentary Association nominated it for the Pare Lorentz Award.

It won the Grand Jury Award from the 2008 Silverdocs Documentary Festival.
