= Our Town =

1938 three-act play by Thornton Wilder

- 1938 first edition cover from the Library of Congress Rare Book and Special Collections Division
- Original language: English
- Written by: Thornton Wilder
- Subject: Life and death in an American small town
- Genre: Drama
- Setting: 1901 to 1913. Grover's Corners, New Hampshire, near Massachusetts.

Premiere
- Date: January 22, 1938
- Place: McCarter Theatre; Princeton, New Jersey

Our Town is a three-act play written by American playwright Thornton Wilder in 1938. Described by Edward Albee as "the greatest American play ever written", it presents the fictional American town of Grover's Corners between 1901 and 1913 through the everyday lives of its citizens.

Wilder uses metatheatrical devices, setting the play in the actual theater where it is being performed. The main character is the stage manager of the theater who directly addresses the audience, brings in guest lecturers, fields questions from the audience, and fills in playing some of the roles. The play is performed without a set on a mostly bare stage. With a few exceptions, the actors mime actions without the use of props.

The first performance of Our Town was at the McCarter Theatre in Princeton, New Jersey, on January 22, 1938. It went on to success on Broadway and received the Pulitzer Prize for Drama, and remains popular today with frequent revivals.

== Synopsis ==
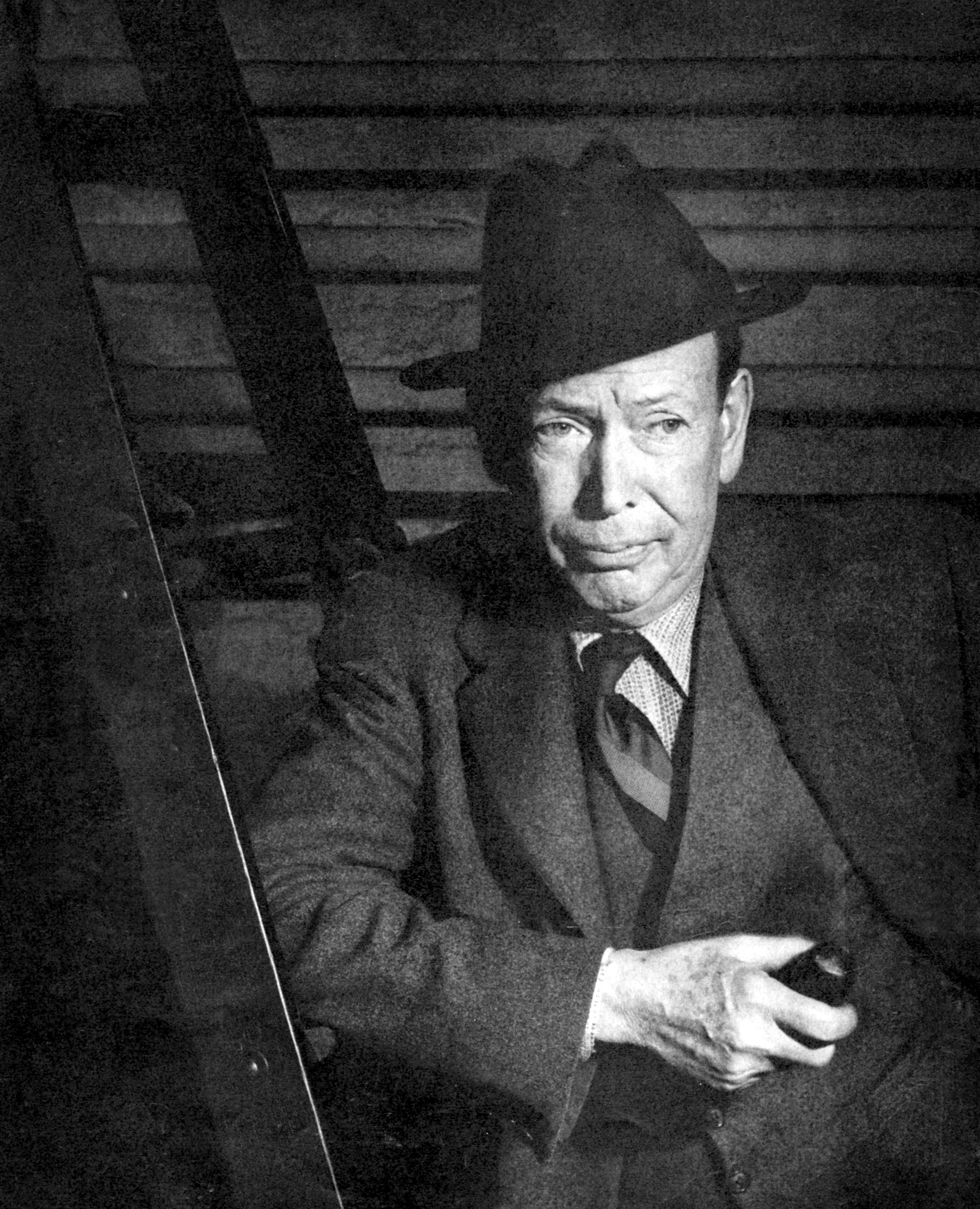
Frank Craven as the Stage Manager in the original Broadway production of Our Town (1938)

=== Act I: Daily Life ===
The Stage Manager introduces the audience to the small town of Grover's Corners, New Hampshire, its geography and main buildings and institutions, as well as the people living there, as morning breaks on May 7, 1901. Joe Crowell delivers the paper to Doc Gibbs, Howie Newsome delivers the milk, and the Webb and Gibbs households send their children (Emily and Wally Webb, George and Rebecca Gibbs) off to school on a beautifully simple morning.

The Stage Manager introduces Professor Willard, who speaks to the audience about the history of the town. Next, Editor Webb speaks to the audience about the town's socioeconomic status, political and religious demographics, and the accessibility and proliferation (or lack thereof) of culture and art in Grover's Corners. The Stage Manager then leads the audience through a series of pivotal moments throughout the afternoon and evening, revealing the characters' relationships and challenges.

Simon Stimson, an organist and choir director at the Congregational Church, is introduced. It is learned from Mrs. Louella Soames that Simon Stimson is an alcoholic when she, Mrs. Gibbs, and Mrs. Webb stop on the corner after choir practice and "gossip like a bunch of old hens", according to Doc Gibbs, discussing Simon's alcoholism. It seems to be a well known fact amongst everyone in town that Simon Stimson has a problem with alcohol; all the characters speak of his issue as if they are aware of it and his having "seen a peck of trouble", a phrase repeated by more than one character throughout the show. While the majority of townsfolk choose to "look the other way", including the town policeman, Constable Warren, it is Mrs. Gibbs who takes Simon's struggles with addiction to heart, and has a conversation with her husband, Doc Gibbs, about Simon's drinking.

Underneath a glowing full moon, Act I ends with siblings George and Rebecca, and Emily gazing out of their respective bedroom windows, enjoying the smell of heliotrope in the "wonderful (or terrible) moonlight", with the self-discovery of Emily and George liking each other, and the realization that they are both straining to grow up in their own way.

The audience is dismissed to the first intermission by the Stage Manager who quips, "That's the end of the First Act, friends. You can go and smoke now, those that smoke."

=== Act II: Love and Marriage ===
The Stage Manager sets the scene by explaining three years have passed, and describing the many changes that can take place when "the sun's come up over a thousand times". The Stage Manager notes the themes of Acts I and II – daily life, then marriage – and adds with portent, "There's another act coming after this: I reckon you can guess what that's about."

George and Emily prepare to wed. The day is filled with stress. Howie Newsome is delivering milk in the pouring rain while Si Crowell, younger brother of Joe, laments how George's baseball talents will be squandered. George pays an impulsive and awkward visit to his soon-to-be in-laws.

Here, the Stage Manager interrupts the scene and takes the audience back a year, to the end of Emily and George's junior year. Emily confronts George about his pride and, over an ice cream soda, they discuss the future and confess their love for each other. George decides not to go to college, as he had planned, but to work and eventually take over his uncle's farm.

Back in the present, George and Emily say that they are not ready to marry – George to his mother, Emily to her father – but they both calm down and happily go through with the wedding. The Stage Manager, as officiant of the wedding, delivers a monologue on the institution of marriage: "people were made to live two by two" – but concludes, "I've married over two hundred couples in my day. Do I believe in it? I don't know."

Nonetheless, the wedding completes and George and Emily leave, ending Act II, as Mrs. Soames exclaims, "I'm sure they'll be happy. I always say: happiness, that's the great thing! The important thing is to be happy."

=== Act III: Death and Eternity ===
Nine years have passed. In a lengthy monologue, the Stage Manager discusses eternity ("we all know something is eternal"), focusing attention on the cemetery outside of town, which dates to the 1670s, including people who have died since the wedding – Mrs. Gibbs (pneumonia, while traveling), Wally Webb (burst appendix, while camping), Mrs. Soames, and Simon Stimson (suicide by hanging). The Stage Manager posits "the dead don't stay interested in us living people for very long ... gradually they lose hold of the earth ... They're waitin'. They're waitin' for something that they feel is comin'. Something important, and great."

Town undertaker Joe Stoddard is introduced, as is a young man named Sam Craig, who has returned to Grover's Corners for his cousin's funeral. That cousin is revealed to be Emily, who died giving birth to her and George's second child.

Once the funeral ends Emily emerges to join the dead and, after observing the grief of George and Dr. Gibbs, asks Mrs. Gibbs if it is possible to temporarily return. Mrs. Gibbs urges her to forget her life, warning her that being able to see but not interact with her family, all the while knowing what will happen in the future, will cause her too much pain. Ignoring the warnings of Simon, Mrs. Soames, and Mrs. Gibbs ("our life here is to forget all that, and think only of what's ahead"), Emily persuades the Stage Manager to return her to Earth to relive one day, her 12th birthday.

She joyfully watches her parents and some of the people of her childhood for the first time in years, but her happiness quickly turns to pain as she realizes how little people appreciate the simple activities of life ("It goes so fast. We don't have time to look at one another."). The recognition proves too painful for her ("all that was going on, and we never noticed") and she realizes that every moment of life should be treasured.

Emily asks the Stage Manager to return her to the dead, then hesitates and in a final monologue says goodbye to mortal life ("Oh Earth, you're too wonderful for anybody to realize you"). She asks the Stage Manager if anyone truly understands the value of life while they live it; he responds, "No. The saints and poets, maybe – they do some."

Emily returns to her grave next to Mrs. Gibbs and watches impassively as George kneels weeping over her. The Stage Manager concludes the play and wishes the audience a good night.

== Characters ==
=== Primary characters ===
- Stage Manager – The narrator and commentator, who guides the audience through Grover's Corners. He periodically participates in the play (as the minister at the wedding, the soda shop owner, a local townsman, etc.) and advises Emily directly after her death.
- Emily Webb – The protagonist, who is followed from a precocious young girl through to her wedding to George Gibbs and death in childbirth.
- George Gibbs – The other main character; the boy next door, a kind but irresponsible teenager who matures over time and becomes a responsible husband, father, and farmer.
- Frank Gibbs – George's father, the town Doctor.
- Julia (Hersey) Gibbs –George's mother, who dreams of going to Paris. She sells an antique piece of furniture for $350, intending to use it for the trip, but instead bequeathes the money to George and Emily. Julia dies while visiting her daughter in Ohio.
- Charles Webb – Editor of the Grover's Corners Sentinel and father of Emily and Wally.
- Myrtle Webb – mother of Emily and Wally.

=== Secondary characters ===
- Joe and Si Crowell – Local paperboys. Joe's intelligence earns him a full scholarship to MIT where he graduates at the top of his class. His promise will be cut short on the fields of France during World War I, according to the Stage Manager. Both he and his brother Si hold marriage in high disdain.
- Simon Stimson – The choir director and church organist. The specific cause of his alcoholism and suicide is never shown, although Joe Stoddard, the undertaker, observes that "He's seen a peck of troubles." He remains bitter and cynical even beyond the grave. Some critics interpret Simon as a closeted homosexual.
- Howie Newsome – The milkman, a fixture of Grover's Corners.
- Rebecca Gibbs – George's younger sister. Later elopes with a traveling salesman and settles in Ohio.
- Wallace "Wally" Webb – Emily's younger brother. Died of a burst appendix on a Boy Scout camping trip.
- Professor Willard – A rather long-winded lecturer.
- Woman in the Balcony – Attendee of Editor Webb's political and social report – concerned with temperance.
- Belligerent Man at Back of Auditorium – Attendee of Editor Webb's political and social report – concerned with social justice.
- Lady in a Box – Attendee of Editor Webb's political and social report – concerned with culture and beauty.
- Mrs. Louella Soames – A gossipy townswoman and member of the choir.
- Constable Bill Warren – The policeman.
- Three Baseball Players – Who mock George at the wedding.
- Joe Stoddard – The undertaker.
- Sam Craig – A nephew of Mrs Gibbs who left town to seek his fortune. He came back after 12 years in Buffalo for Emily's funeral.
- Man from among the Dead
- Woman from among the Dead
- Mr. Carter (Dead)
- Farmer McCarty (Dead)
- Bessie – Howie Newsome's horse, visible to the characters, but not the audience.

=== Casting in some notable productions ===
Character	Broadway	Broadway Revival	Broadway Revival	West End	Broadway Revival	Off-Broadway Revival	Off-West End Revival	Broadway Revival
Character	1938	1969	1988	1991	2002	2009	2014	2024
The Stage Manager	Frank Craven	Henry Fonda	Spalding Gray	Alan Alda	Paul Newman	David Cromer	David Cromer	Jim Parsons
Emily Webb	Martha Scott	Elizabeth Hartman	Penelope Ann Miller	Jemma Redgrave	Maggie Lacey	Jennifer Grace	Laura Elsworthy	Zoey Deutch
George Gibbs	John Craven	Harvey Evans	Eric Stoltz	Robert Sean Leonard	Ben Fox	James McMenamin	David Walmsley	Ephraim Sykes
Doctor Frank Gibbs	Jay Fassett	Ed Begley	James Rebhorn	John Rowe	Frank Converse	Mark L. Montgomery	Rhashan Stone	Billy Eugene Jones
Julia Hersey Gibbs	Evelyn Varden	Mildred Natwick	Frances Conroy	Rosemary Martin	Jayne Atkinson	Lori Myers	Anna Francolini	Michelle Wilson
Myrtle Webb	Helen Carew	Irene Tedrow	Roberta Maxwell	Rowena Cooper	Jane Curtin	Kati Brazda	Kate Dickie	Katie Holmes
Editor Charles Webb	Thomas W. Ross	John Randolph	Peter Maloney	John Normington	Jeffrey DeMunn	Ken Marks	Richard Lumsden	Richard Thomas

== Composition ==
Wilder began making notes for the play while he was teaching and lecturing in Chicago in the 1930s. Constantly on the move, he worked on the play wherever he went. In June 1937, he stayed in the MacDowell Colony in Peterborough, New Hampshire, one of the many locations where he worked on the play. It is believed Wilder drafted the entire third act during a visit to Zürich in September 1937, in one day, after a long evening walk in the rain with a friend, author Samuel Morris Steward.

Wilder explained his vision in writing the play:

"Our Town" is not offered as a picture of life in a New Hampshire village or as a speculation about the condition of life after death ... It is an attempt to find a value above all price for the smallest events in our life. I have made the claim as preposterous as possible, for I have set the village against the largest dimension of time and place. The recurrent words in this play (few have noticed it) are "hundreds", "thousands", and "millions".

== Setting ==
The play is set in the actual theatre where the play is being performed, but the date is always May 7, 1901. The Stage Manager of the May 7, 1901, production introduces the play-within-the-play, which is set in the fictional community of Grover's Corners, New Hampshire. The Stage Manager locates Grover's Corners at latitude 42° 40′ N and longitude 70° 37′ W, though these coordinates are actually in waters about 300 meters off the coast of Rockport, Massachusetts. At the beginning of Act III, he mentions several nearby New Hampshire landmarks, including Mt. Monadnock and the towns of Jaffrey, Jaffrey Center, Peterborough, and Dublin.

== Style ==
In Wilder's writing of Our Town, he employed a metatheatrical style. He utilized the Stage Manager role to narrate the story and also to appear as several different characters. The Stage Manager, as the play's "Narrator", creates the story's point of view. The Narrator is supernatural as he is entirely aware of his relationship with the audience; as such it allows him freedom to break the fourth wall and address them directly.

The play's stage direction indicates that the play is to be staged and performed with little scenery, no set, and minimal props. Wilder's reasoning was, "... I tried to restore significance to the small details of life by removing the scenery. The spectator through lending his imagination to the action restages it inside his own head. In its healthiest ages, the theatre has always exhibited the least scenery."

Wilder commented on the sparse stage setting:

Each individual assertion to an absolute reality can only be inner, very inner. And here the method of staging finds its justification–in the first two acts there are at least a few chairs and tables; but when Emily revisits the earth and the kitchen to which she descended on her twelfth birthday, the very chairs and table are gone. Our claim, our hope, our despair is in the mind–not in things, not in "scenery". Moliere said that for the theater all he needed was a platform and a passion or two. The climax of this play needs only five square feet of boarding and the passion to know what life means to us.

The characters mime the objects with which they interact. Their surroundings are created only with chairs, tables, staircases, and other mundane objects. For example, the scene in which Emily helps George with his evening homework, conversing through upstairs windows, is often performed with the two actors standing atop separate ladders to represent their neighboring houses.

Wilder called Our Town his favorite out of all his works, but complained that it was rarely done right, insisting that it "should be performed without sentimentality or ponderousness – simply, dryly, and sincerely".

== Production history ==
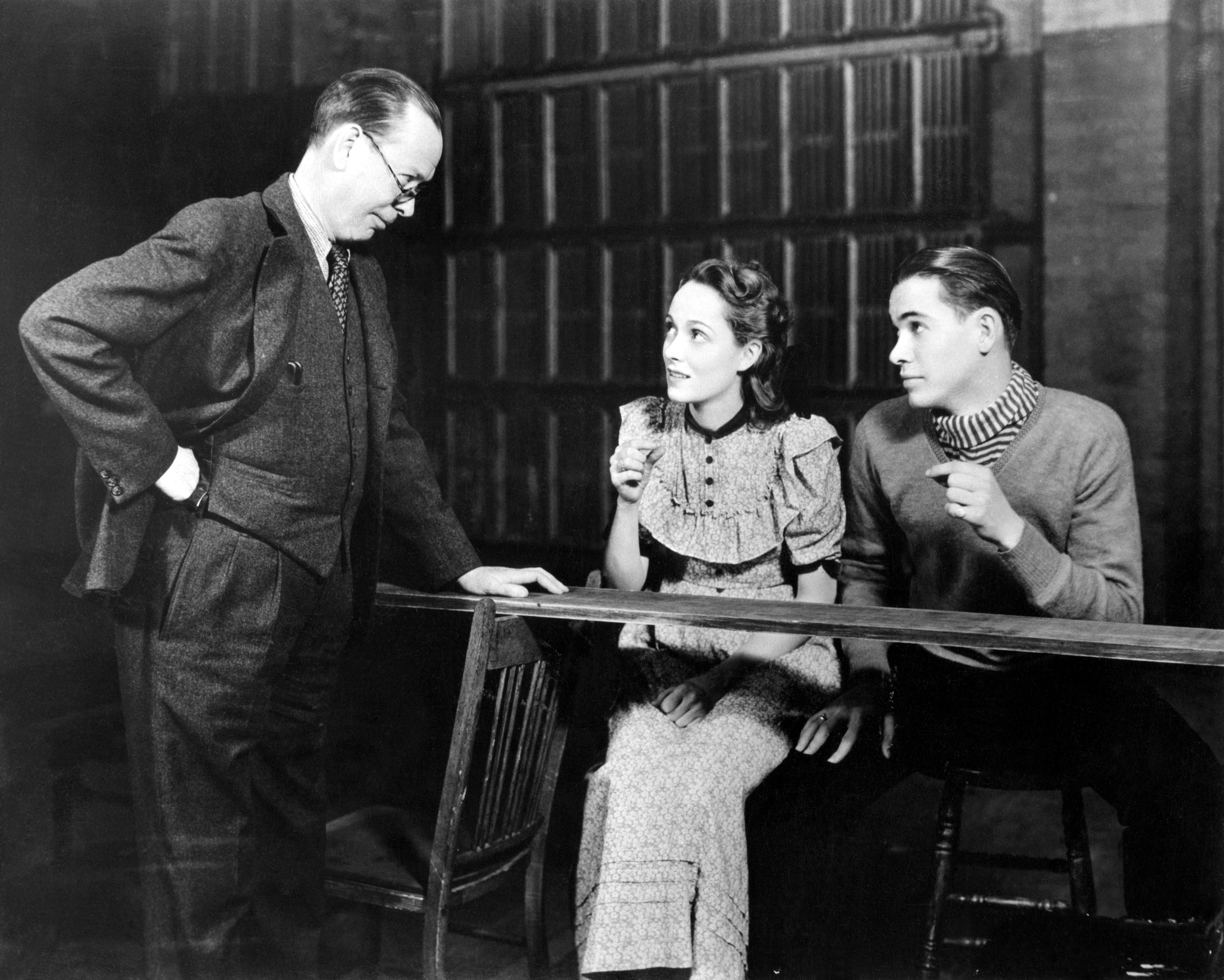
Frank Craven, Martha Scott and John Craven in the original Broadway production of Our Town (1938)

Our Town was first performed at the McCarter Theater in Princeton, New Jersey, on January 22, 1938.

It next opened at the Wilbur Theatre in Boston, on January 25, 1938.

The New York City debut of Our Town was on February 4, 1938, at Henry Miller's Theatre and later moved to the Morosco Theatre, where it ran until November 19, 1938; this production was produced and directed by Jed Harris. Wilder received the Pulitzer Prize for Drama in 1938 for the work. The Jed Harris production of Our Town was revived at New York City Center on January 10, 1944, running for 24 performances until January 29, with Montgomery Clift as George, Martha Scott as Emily, and Thomas W. Ross as Mr. Webb.

In 1946, the Soviet Union prevented a production of Our Town in the Soviet sector of occupied Berlin "on the grounds that the drama is too depressing and could inspire a German suicide wave".

Victor Carin directed a production by the Edinburgh Gateway Company in 1965.

Henry Fonda played the Stage Manager in a production that ran on Broadway from Nov 27 to Dec 27, 1969. Elizabeth Hartman played Emily and Harvey Evans played George. Margaret Hamilton and Ed Begley were in the cast.

A production at New York City's Lyceum Theatre, produced by Lincoln Center opened on December 4, 1988, after 27 previews, and ran for 136 performances until April 2, 1989; the cast included Spalding Gray as "Stage Manager", Frances Conroy as Mrs. Gibbs, Penelope Ann Miller as Emily, and Eric Stoltz as George.

The National Asian American Theater Company staged it in 1994. The production was praised for its casting by The Record, particularly the depiction of the character Emily by Yumi Iwama which added nothing "but beauty to this great and beautiful play".

In 2003, Paul Newman, marking his final stage performance, acted in the role of Stage Manager, with Jayne Atkinson as Mrs. Gibbs and Jane Curtin as Mrs. Webb, in a production staged at New York City's Booth Theatre directed by James Naughton. It opened on December 4, 2002, after three previews and ran until January 26, 2003. The production was videotaped for broadcast on Showtime and later on PBS (see "Adaptations" below).

A revival of Our Town opened at the Barrow Street Theatre, in New York City, on February 26, 2009. The production was directed by David Cromer, who also performed the role of Stage Manager for much of the show's run. Upon closing, the production had played four preview and 644 regular performances, making it the longest-running production of the play in its history. In addition to Cromer, other notable actors who performed in the role of Stage Manager included Helen Hunt, Michael McKean, Jason Butler Harner, Stephen Kunken and Michael Shannon.

In 2017, Tony Award–winning Deaf West Theater, a Los Angeles–based theater company, co-produced with the Pasadena Playhouse a production of Our Town performed in American Sign Language and spoken English.

A new revival directed by Kenny Leon opened on Broadway on October 10, 2024 with Jim Parsons as the Stage Manager, Zoey Deutch as Emily Webb, Katie Holmes as Mrs. Webb, Billy Eugene Jones as Dr. Gibbs, Ephraim Sykes as George Gibbs, Richard Thomas as Mr. Webb, Michelle Wilson as Mrs. Gibbs, Julie Halston as Mrs. Soames, and Donald Webber Jr. as Simon Stimpson. The production began previews on 17 September 2024 at the Ethel Barrymore Theatre. This production closed on January 19, 2025.

== Awards ==
- 1938 Pulitzer Prize for Drama. On May 2, 1938, Thornton Wilder won the prize of $1,000 "for the original American play ... which shall represent in marked fashion the educational value and power of the stage, preferably dealing with the American life".
- 1938 New York Drama Critics' Circle Award for Best American Play (runner-up)
- 1989 Drama Desk Award for Outstanding Revival of a Play
- 1989 Tony Award for Best Revival of a Play

== Adaptations ==
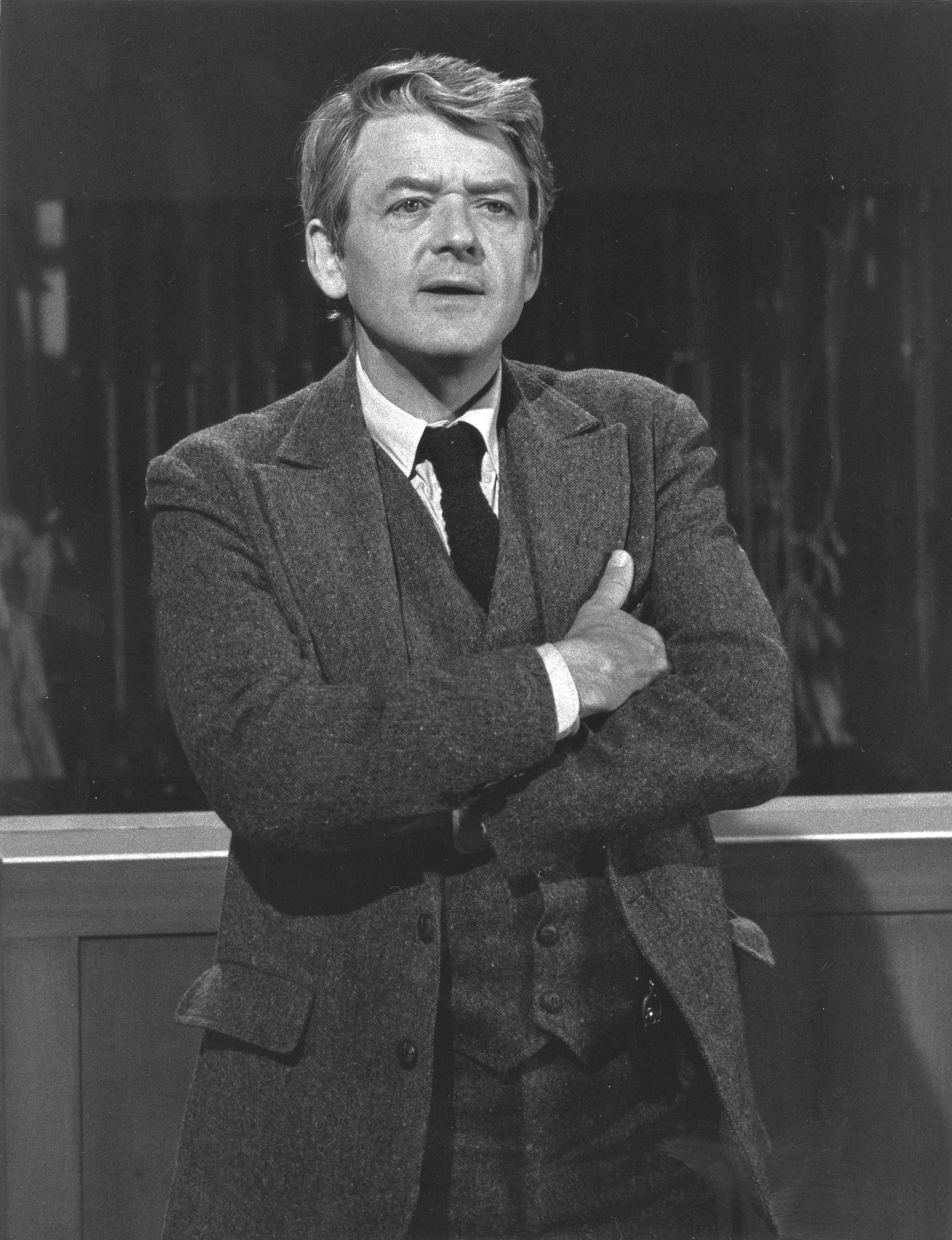
Hal Holbrook as the Stage Manager in the 1977 television adaptation.

- Our Town was first performed on radio May 12, 1939, on The Campbell Playhouse. The cast included Orson Welles as the Stage Manager, John Craven, of the original stage production, as George Gibbs, and Patricia Newton as Emily Webb.
- Our Town (1940 film), an adaptation starring Martha Scott as Emily and William Holden as George Gibbs, with an original music score composed by Aaron Copland. Four members of the original cast repeated their roles in this film, although the ending was changed with Wilder’s approval so that Emily lived.
- Our Town (1940 radio): on May 6, 1940, a radio version was performed by many of the same film actors for Lux Radio Theater.
- Our Town (1946 radio): on September 29, 1946, a radio version was performed on the Theatre Guild on the Air featuring Thornton Wilder himself as the Stage Manager and Dorothy McGuire as Emily.
- In 1953, The Ford 50th Anniversary Show, broadcast live on both the CBS and NBC television networks, featured a scene from Our Town, including performances by Mary Martin and Oscar Hammerstein II. The Ford show attracted an audience of 60 million viewers. Forty years after the broadcast, television critic Tom Shales recalled the broadcast as both "a landmark in television" and "a milestone in the cultural life of the '50s".
- Our Town (television), a live musical 1955 television adaptation on Producers' Showcase starring Frank Sinatra as the Stage Manager, Paul Newman as George Gibbs, and Eva Marie Saint as Emily. The first and only musical version of the play to be telecast. The song "Love and Marriage" was written for this production by Jimmy van Heusen and Sammy Cahn.
- Our Town, a 1977 television adaptation of the play. This adaptation starred Hal Holbrook as the Stage Manager, Robby Benson as George Gibbs and Glynnis O'Connor as Emily Webb, and also featured Ned Beatty, Barbara Bel Geddes and Sada Thompson.
- Grover's Corners, a 1987 musical adaptation with music and lyrics by Tom Jones and Harvey Schmidt was performed at the Marriott Theatre in Lincolnshire, Illinois.
- Our Town, a 1989 telecast of a Lincoln Center stage production starring Spalding Gray, Frances Conroy, Penelope Ann Miller, and Eric Stoltz.
- In 1994, Philip Jerry choreographed a balletic adaptation set to the music of Aaron Copland which the American Repertory Ballet in Princeton, New Jersey, has performed in the decades since its premiere.
- The 1996 movie The Birdcage mentions Grover’s Corners as Nathan Lane’s character’s home town.
- OT: Our Town, a 2002 documentary by Scott Hamilton Kennedy about a production of the play by Dominguez High School in Compton, California.
- Our Town, a 2003 television film adaptation starring Paul Newman as the Stage Manager. It was shown on PBS as part of Masterpiece Theatre after first being shown on the cable channel Showtime. It was filmed at the Booth Theatre in Manhattan, where it played on Broadway in 2002.
- Our Town (opera), an operatic version of the play with music by Ned Rorem.
- Wonder has a mention of the play, but only the beginning and end scenes are depicted.
- The style of the play is mimicked in the 2003 Lars Von Trier film Dogville.
- A performance of Our Town is central to Ann Patchett's 2023 novel Tom Lake.
- In Season 2 of The Big Door Prize, a major subplot involves a WWE-themed production of Our Town.
- A re-imagining of Our Town with Welsh accents and Welsh language hymns but still set in New Hampshire for Welsh National Theatre's inaugural season in 2026, starring Michael Sheen as The Stage Manager. The production was critically well received, and won Best Play Revival at the UK Theatre Awards 2026.
- The study of Our Town is central to the plot of the first season Star Trek: Starfleet Academy episode "The Life of the Stars" (2026).
- Our Town is the play put on by the Drama Club in the show My So-Called Life episode "Betrayal". The last scene of the episode shows Rayanne (cast as Emily in the play) rehearsing the last scene. The dialogue in the play mirrors the conflict between her and Angela, whom Rayanne betrayed earlier in the episode.
- The MGM miniseries American Classic (2026) stars Kevin Kline as a New York actor who returns to his small hometown in Pennsylvania, where he stages a production of Our Town with townspeople in the roles.
