= Juanita Tate =

American activist

Juanita Tate (1938 – July 5, 2004) was an American community developer who organized and developed real estate to address environmental justice, affordable housing, and economic access for all South Central Los Angeles residents. She is responsible for building housing and a shopping center to eliminate food disparities in South Central Los Angeles after the 1992 Los Angeles riots. She incorporated Concerned Citizens of South Central Los Angeles as a non-profit entity. Concerned Citizens of South Central LA. She was born in Philadelphia, Pennsylvania, and relocated to the city of Los Angeles in the early 1980s to help the telephone company prepare for the 1984 Olympics, and be close to her paternal family that migrated from Augusta, Georgia to South Central Los Angeles in 1905.

Tate was a member of the City of Los Angeles's Environmental Action Commission from 2002 until her death from complications of a stroke.

Juanita Tate Elementary School is built on land seized by the Los Angeles Unified School District from the Concerned Citizens of South Central LA.

There is a retail shopping center named for Juanita Tate, The Juanita Tate Marketplace. Opened in April 2014 in Southern Los Angeles, the retail shopping center built on a brownfield that was formerly a scrap yard and recycling center, commemorates her contribution to the community while she was a CCSCLA member. In April 2015 the marketplace was sold to private investors.

== Honors ==
- NAACP Legacy Award
- Western Center for Law and Poverty Community Service Award
- California Community Foundation Unsung Hero Award
- California State Legislature Woman of the Year Award

== See also ==
- South Central Farm
