= OT: Our Town =

2002 documentary film

OT: Our Town is a 2002 documentary film directed by Scott Hamilton Kennedy. It is set at Dominguez High School in Compton, California. The school has not produced a play in twenty years and has no budget, nor a stage. The film documents the efforts by two teachers and twenty-four students to adapt and update Thornton Wilder's 1938 American classic Our Town, set in an all-white small town between the years 1901 and 1913, to better reflect the ethnic background of Dominguez High School and Compton in the year 2000. The film documents rehearsals and the self-doubts experienced leading up to the performance on June 8–10, 2000 in the school's cafeteria.

== Reception ==
A. O. Scott of The New York Times called the film "a modest, moving documentary", noting that "Kennedy observes his subjects with sympathy and tact, and he does the students the courtesy of allowing them to explain themselves, which they do with candor, heart and humor." Ernest Hardy of the LA Weekly praised the film for portraying "a Los Angeles that’s never been put on film".

On review aggregator website Rotten Tomatoes, the film holds an approval rating of 88% based on 25 reviews, with an average rating of 7.4/10.

== Awards ==
- Aspen Filmfest - won Audience Award
- Heartland Film Festival - won Crystal Heart Award.
- Los Angeles IFP/West Film Festival - won Best Documentary.
- Palm Springs International Film Festival - won Audience Award for Best Documentary Feature.
- Santa Monica Film Festival - won SM/F2 Award.
