= Scott Hamilton Kennedy =

Documentary film director and public speaker

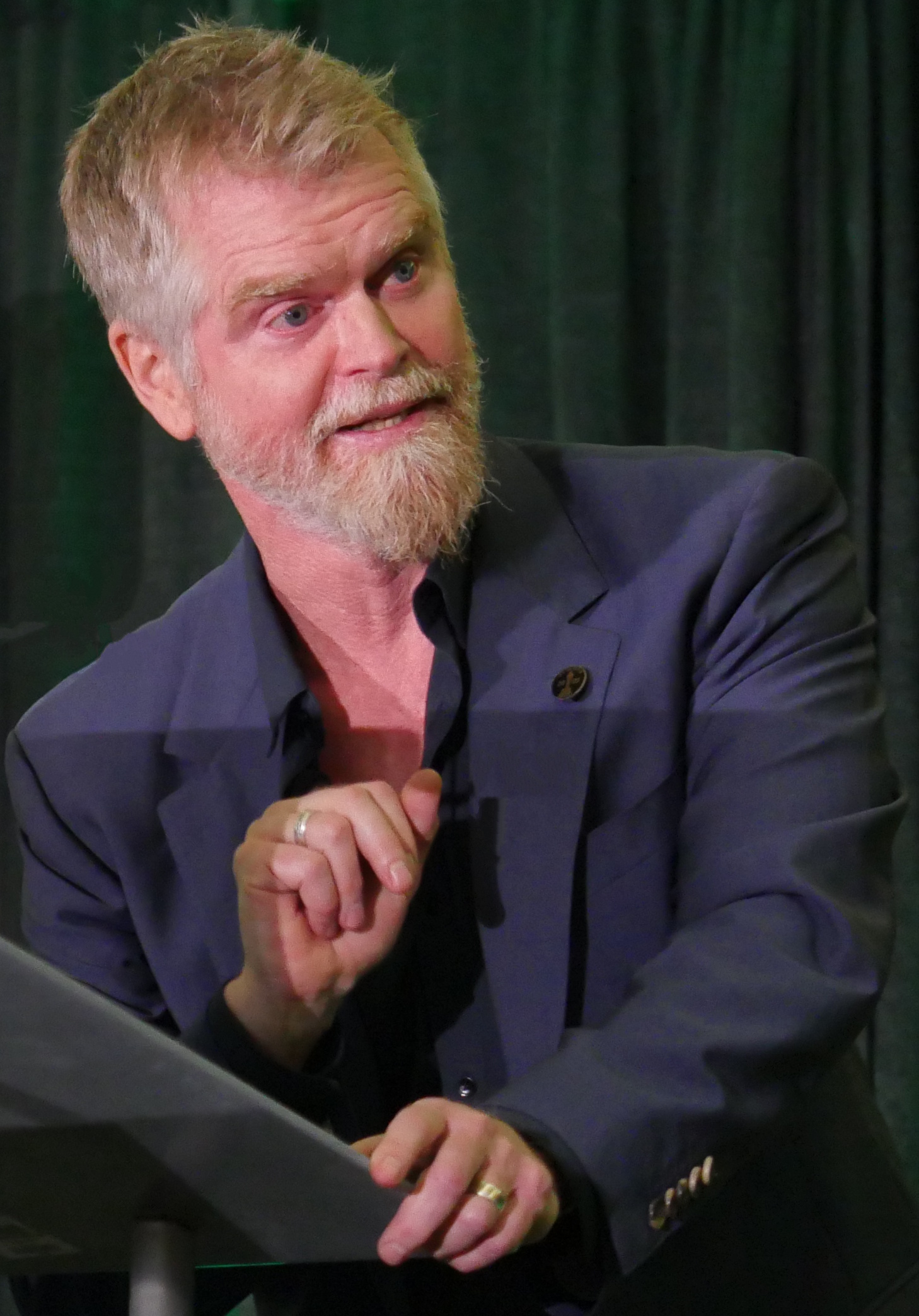
- Scott Hamilton Kennedy at CSICon 2026
- Born: April 26, 1965 (age 61); Kentucky, U.S.
- Occupations: Documentary film director; writer; producer; cameraman; editor
- Years active: 1988–present
- Known for: Documentaries
- Notable work: The Garden and Food Evolution

Scott Hamilton Kennedy (born 1965) is an Academy Award nominated documentary director, as well as a writer, producer, cameraman, and editor. He is the founder of Black Valley Films, a film production company based in Los Angeles, California.

He is the son of the prominent New York criminal lawyer, Michael John Kennedy.

== Early career ==
Kennedy graduated from Skidmore College and started his career in New York City. He worked on a variety of television and film platforms, including scripted and unscripted television, commercials, and music videos. Kennedy got his start by working with "low-budget legend Roger Corman to direct four TV features, each shot in six days." He also directed the Jimmy Cliff version of "I Can See Clearly Now" for the film Cool Runnings (1993).

== Feature films ==
=== OT: Our Town ===
Kennedy's first feature documentary is OT: Our Town, which follows Dominguez High School in Compton, California and their journey to attempt to put on Thornton Wilder’s play, Our Town. OT: Our Town screened at many film festivals, including: Toronto, Tribeca, and SXSW. It won awards at several festivals, like: Los Angeles for Best Documentary, Palm Springs International for the Audience Award, and Aspen FilmFest for the Audience Award. OT was nominated for an Independent Spirit Award and awarded a Human and Civil Rights award for the National Education Association (NEA). The film was a critical success, being praised by the L.A. Times and Seattle Times.

=== The Garden ===
The Garden tells the story of the South Central Community Garden, which is the largest of its kind in the United States, and the complicated struggle it endured in order to survive. The film premiered at the AFI Silverdocs Film Festival, where it won Best Documentary, and eventually went on to win other awards at The Florida Film Festival, The Camden International Film Festival, and the MMPA Diversity Award. The Garden also earned a nomination for the 81st Academy Awards for Best Documentary. The film has received rave reviews from critics, like Kenneth Turan of the L.A. Times, quoted: “Excellent! Its lessons about the levers of power and politics, and how easy it is to get co-opted, are relevant everywhere. The Garden is a potent human drama.”

=== Fame High ===
Kennedy's third feature documentary is Fame High, which centers around the Los Angeles County High School for the Arts, and follows a group of freshmen and seniors through a school year as they strive to become successful actors, singers, dancers, and musicians. The film received exceptional reviews from the L.A. Times and N.Y. Times, and went on with a successful theatrical and digital release in 2013 before premiering on Showtime and Netflix in September 2013.

=== Food Evolution ===
Food Evolution is Kennedy's fourth documentary. Narrated by the well-respected astrophysicist and science communicator Neil deGrasse Tyson, Food Evolution highlights the importance of using the scientific method regarding the outlook on Genetically Modified Organisms, or GMO, foods. The film was well-received but also controversial in 2017. It earned a rare 100% on Rotten Tomatoes, and critics attested to it, with the L.A. Times writing: "Calm, careful, potentially revolutionary, Food Evolution is an iconoclastic documentary on a hot-button topic,” and the N.Y. Times saying: "Food Evolution posits an inconvenient truth for organic boosters to swallow: In a world desperate for safe, sustainable food, GMOs may well be a force for good." The film has been screened at the DC Environmental Film Festival, EU Parliament, UN Food and Agriculture Organization, and more.

=== SHOT IN THE ARM ===
SHOT IN THE ARM is Kennedy's latest documentary. It began as an investigation into the 2019 global measles epidemic, documenting public health officials as well as the anti-vaxxers who helped cause the breakout... And then Covid-19 happened, and the world was forever changed.

When COVID struck, many hoped that the global challenge would unite us. Instead, it put an underlying threat into focus – the contagion of disinformation and conspiracy at the expense of unbiased science and rational thought. Both skeptical and hopeful, SHOT IN THE ARM reaches hearts and minds in a way that mere data cannot.

== Teaching ==
Kennedy is also known as a public speaker and educator. He has taught master classes at prominent universities such as Carnegie Mellon, USC, and the Claremont Colleges. He participated in the American Documentary Showcase, a Cultural Presentation of the U.S. State Department. ADS partners with the local Embassy, bringing in filmmakers to show their work and teach in countries all over the world.

== Filmography ==
- 2002: OT: Our Town (Director/Editor/Producer)
- 2003: Faking It (Director/Producer)
- 2006: Livin' It Up With The Bratz (Director/Editor/Writer)
- 2008: The Garden (Director/Editor/Producer/Writer)
- 2011: Grace & Mercy (Editor)
- 2012: Fame High (Director/Editor/Producer)
- 2016: Food Evolution (Director/co-editor/co-writer/co-producer)
