= Baba Dioum =

Senegalese forestry engineer

Baba Dioum (born 15 October 1937) is a Senegalese forestry engineer. In a paper presented in New Delhi in 1968, at the triennial meeting of the General Assembly of the International Union for the Conservation of Nature and Natural Resources (IUCN), Dioum made the much anthologised statement: "In the end we will conserve only what we love, we will love only what we understand, and we will understand only what we are taught." His major concerns have been agricultural development and natural resource management.

Dioum was born in Dahra, in a rural region of Senegal. As a youth he attended Koranic school in Dahra and worked in the fields. His father sold groundnuts and cattle to the French. He later studied at a regional primary school in Linguère, then at the École Blanchot in Saint-Louis and the Lycée Van Vollenhoven in Dakar. After graduation, he studied natural sciences at the University of Dakar before moving to France to continue those studies at the Sorbonne. He completed his education at the École nationale des eaux et forêts in Nancy, from which he received his Diplôme d'Ingénieur des Eaux et Forêts (diploma of water and forestry engineering).

In 1967, Dioum became Director General of Water and Forestry in Senegal, a post he held until 1973. From 1974 to 1980 he was chief executive officer of the Société Nationale de Fourrage (SONAFOR). From 1981 to 1995 he was Director of the Agricultural Policy Unit in the Senegalese Ministry of Agriculture. Since 1991 he has acted as Coordinator General for the Conference of West and Central African Ministers of Agriculture, which he helped to organise while working in the Senegalese ministry. He has been on the boards of directors of the International Food Policy Research Institute and the International Fertilizer Development Center.
