= Emma Naluyima =

Ugandan veterinarian and urban farmer

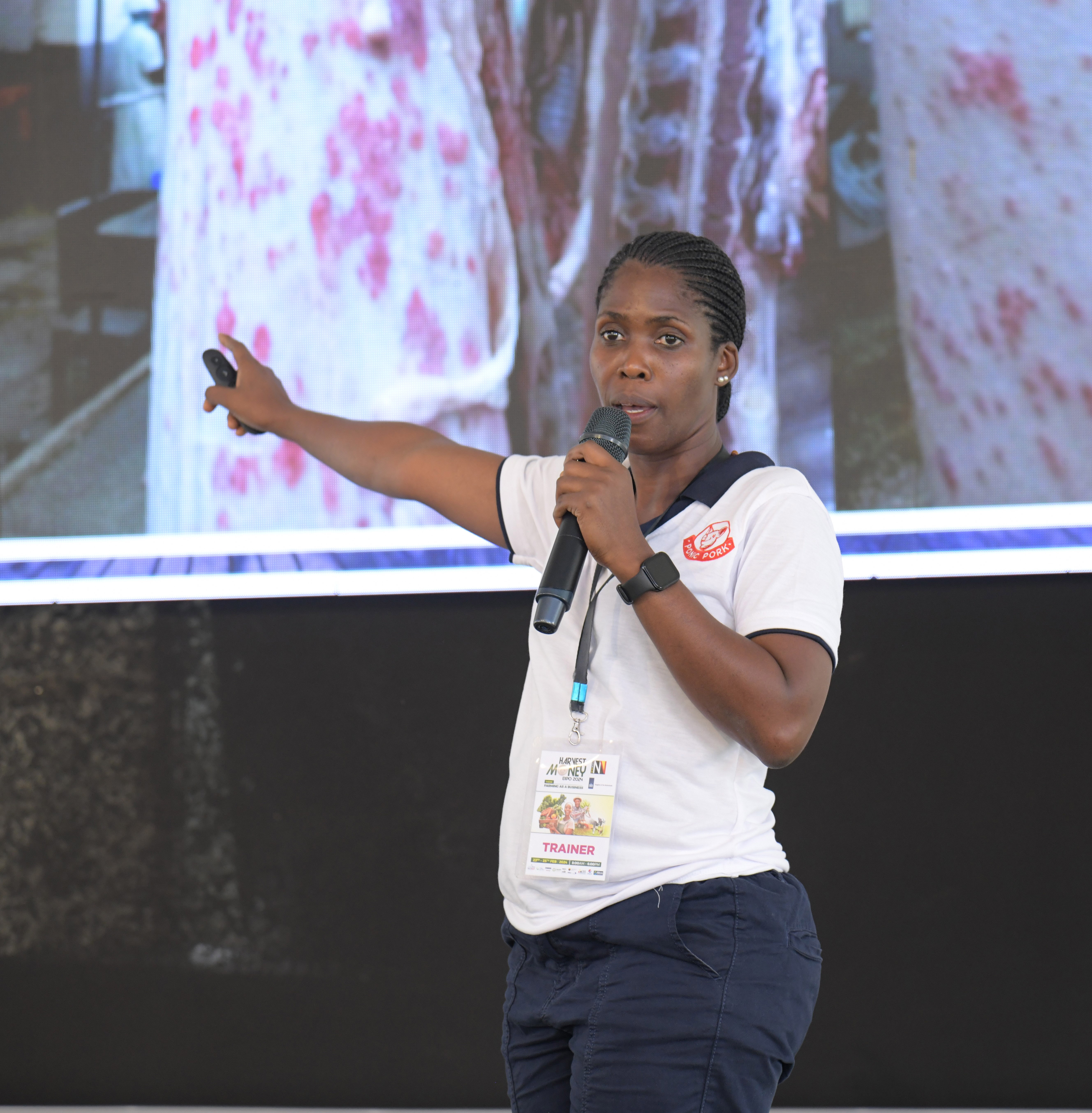
- Born: 1980 (age 45–46); Entebbe, Uganda
- Citizenship: Ugandan
- Education: Maryhill High School (High School Diploma); Makerere University (Bachelor of Veterinary Medicine) (Master of Health Services Research in Veterinary Medicine)
- Occupations: Veterinarian, Farmer and Educator
- Years active: 2000–present
- Spouse: (Ssalongo Washington Mugerwa)

Emma Naluyima (born circa 1980) is a Ugandan veterinarian, urban farmer, businesswoman, elementary school educator and animal & crop farming instructor. It is calculated that she earns approximately US$100,000 annually from her farm situated on 1.0 acre (0.40 ha), in Bwerenga, Wakiso District, Uganda.

== Early life and education ==
Naluyima was born circa 1980 in Entebbe, Uganda. Her father, Chris Kikwabanga, was an airline pilot and her mother, Margaret Nanziri, was a banker. Naluyima attended Stella Maris Primary School in Nkokonjeru, in Buikwe District. For her O-Level and A-Level studies, she attended Maryhill High School in the city of Mbarara. She was then admitted to Makerere University, Uganda's largest and oldest public university, graduating with a Bachelor of Veterinary Medicine degree. Later, she was awarded a Master of Health Services Research in Veterinary Medicine, by Makerere University.

== Career ==
When Naluyima graduated with her BVM degree in 2004, the National Animal Genetic Resources Centre and Databank (Nagric), in Entebbe, offered her a full-time job, complete with a government house. After two years at Nagric, she resigned from the salaried job, in August 2006 and started her first piggery, on a small family plot of land, with USh2 million (approximately US$1,000 at that time) of borrowed money. That piggery paid for her master's degree. In 2010, she married Ssalongo Washington Mugerwa, a school teacher. They bought 6.5 acres (3 ha) and Naluyima relocated her ten pigs to their new home.

== Investments ==
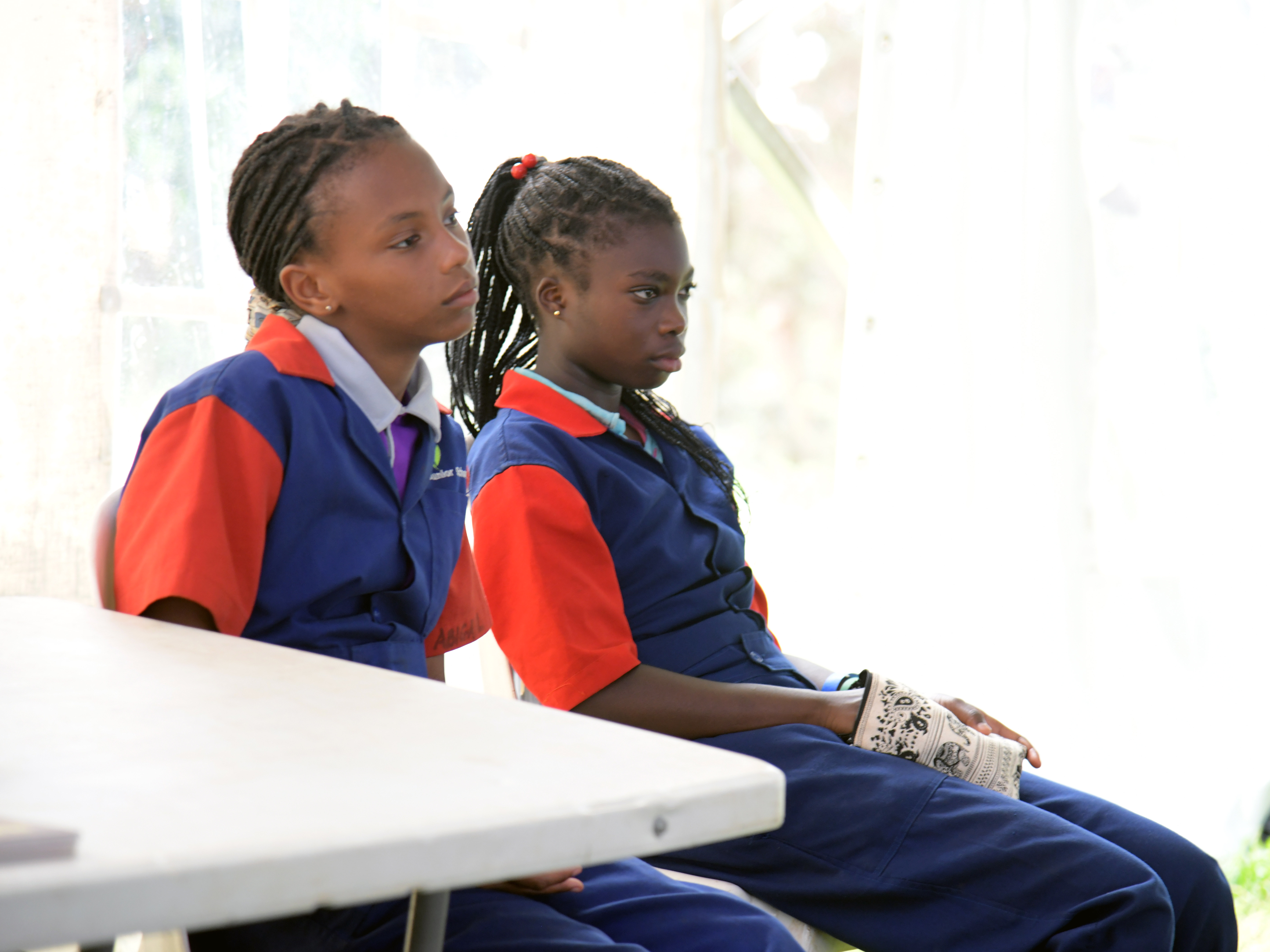
Dr Naluyima's Students

Her current portfolio includes (a) a plantation of matooke and vegetables, including tomatoes, spinach, cucumber, potatoes and greens. (b) A piggery of approximately 30 Camborough pigs. (c) Entebbe Animal Care Centre, a veterinary clinic. (d) An elementary school with approximately 300 students and 20 teachers.

(e) A snail farm where snail glue is sold to cosmetic manufacturers. (f) She also keeps about one dozen dairy cows, a flock of chickens and four above-ground plastic fishponds stocked with tilapia and catfish. (g) Tours of her farm cost USh100,000 (approx. US$28) per head. She calls her farm One Acre Limited.

== Awards ==
In September 2019, Emma Naluyima was a joint winner of the 2019 Africa Food Prize (formerly the Yara Prize). Her joint winner was Baba Dioum of Senegal. The two shared a US$100,000 cash prize.

== Family ==
Emma Naluyima is married to Ssalongo Washington Mugerwa with whom she has four children, including a set of twin-firstborn daughters, born circa 2011.

== See also ==
- Agriculture in Uganda
- Dairy industry in Uganda
