= Concerned Citizens of South Central Los Angeles =

US non-profit organization

Concerned Citizens of South Central Los Angeles (CCSCLA) is a non-profit 501(c)(3) community-based organization whose mission is to work for social justice and economic and environmental change within the South Central community. CCSCLA works to involve community members in identifying social, economic, and environmental areas of concern to them, and give them the tools necessary to engage with institutions, such as industries or political leaders, to enact change.

The designation of 501(c)(3) signifies the organization's area of concentration. This area consists of the Santa Monica freeway to the North, the Harbor Freeway to the West, Slauson Avenue to the South and Alameda to the East. It includes the Vermont Central neighborhood and Central Avenue Corridor. Since its founding, CCSCLA has expanded its work into other low-income neighborhoods, including Watts and Compton. At the time of its founding, CCSCLA's area of concentration had one of the highest populations of African Americans in Los Angeles.

CCSCLA felt it needed to develop a base in order to enact substantial change. Starting in 1990, they began to organize block clubs throughout the Vernon-Central Area. To date, CCSCLA has been able to organize 57 block clubs. The primary issue of concern among all block clubs is the conditions of streets. Alleys in CCSCLA's area of concern were considered to be the worst in Los Angeles in the organization's beginning stages.

== History ==
The Concerned Citizens of South Central Los Angeles was founded in 1985 by Robin Cannon and Charlotte Bullock in order to form a group to protest the construction of a waste incinerator known as the LANCER within the predominately low income, colored community. By 1987, its construction was successfully thwarted protests by the CCSCLA being large contributing factor to the decision.

Since dismantling the LANCER, CCSCLA has broadened its mission, fighting to better the communities of South Central LA with a number of programs that still exist today. This includes campaigns fighting against environmental hazards in the community, alleyway clean ups, affordable housing projects, and youth programs.

== Environmental justice and CCSCLA ==
Born from the recognition that environmental hazards are unequally distributed across the United States (poor and colored communities in close proximity, and richer and white communities safely farther away) the environmental justice movement seeks to draw attention to and rectify these harms. This understanding, that poor and colored communities are disproportionately being exposed to environmental hazards, has been brought about by dozens of studies completed in the last thirty years. environmental justice as a political movement is constituted of events and strategies aimed at achieving social and economic justice in regards to the environmental hazards plaguing marginalized communities. President Bill Clinton's Executive Order 12898 on Environmental Justice in 1994 adopted the work of the movement and created federal government policy. The order required federal agencies to work to identify and address "disproportionately high adverse health or environmental effects of their policies on low-income people and people of color." and "look for ways to prevent discrimination by race, color or national origin in any federally funded programs dealing with health or the environment." Despite the recognition of the federal government and the adoption of the theories developed in response to the environmental justice movement, the movement itself is largely characterized by grassroots activism.

Community based groups are fighting specifically against environmental hazards that are placed in close proximity to their communities that have negative health effects on their surrounding populations. CCSCLA is cited as a defining community activist group for the movement. CCSCLA set an example on how to mobilize a marginalized community by forming coalitions and networking within their affected community. In this way CCSCLA was able to organize local business owners, lawyers, and legislators into a collective force invested in fighting for environmental justice. CCSCLA first mobilized in response to the proposed construction of the LANCER incinerator, and were pushed to use this community based approach because of the denial of support from mainstream environmental groups (MEGs). The Sierra Club and Environmental Defense Fund specifically refused to aid CCSCLA because CCSCLA was dealing with "a community health issue, not an environmental one." Fueling this dismissal of a request for aid was the neglect of MEGs to acknowledge the theoretical understandings of the environmental justice movement- that "social inequality and imbalances of power are at the heart of environmental degradation, resource depletion, pollution and even overpopulation." CCSCLA continues to affect community change today and in doing so they continue to challenge the narrow definition of environment that is currently utilized by many MEGs. CCSCLA accomplishes this by focusing on the intersectionality of race, concentrated poverty, social isolation, and environmental health. CCSCLA comments on what the "environment" entails for them: "CCSCLA realize that the environment consists of more than just hazardous waste, chemicals, and air quality control; our environment is also the quality of our housing stock, the conditions of our schools and the safety of our neighborhoods"

== Primary interests ==
=== Affordable housing ===
It is CCSCLA's belief that empowering and growing the community of South Central Los Angeles both economically and socially will in turn better the environmental conditions of the area. Their involvement in providing and protecting affordable housing started with their fight against the demolition of affordable housing for the construction of a school. They won the case and went on to start sponsoring and constructing affordable housing developments. CCSCLA is able to not only provide affordable housing units, but they also employ community members and local businesses during the construction and set up community programs within the developments.

=== Youth development ===
CCSCLA invests in educating and benefiting the youth populations of South Central Los Angeles. Training and cultivating the youth population of the community is important for its sustainability. CCSCLA not only provides programs for youth recreation, but also education on the community issues, and programs for professional development. The most notable programs CCSCLA has created are: People Organizing for Workplace and Environmental Rights (POWER), The Entertainment Industry Training Program (EITP), and The Antes Columbus Youth Football Club in partnership with the Los Angeles Metropolitan Churches.

=== Environmental health ===
Through its dealings and defeat of the LANCER project, CCSCLA members realized that there is more to the environment than just hazardous waste, chemicals, and air quality control- "our environment is also the quality of our housing stock, the conditions of our schools and the safety of our neighborhoods. All of these factors effect how we are able to happily co-exist in the same community."

CCSCLA continues to work on environmental issues such as recycling, the cleaning of alleyways and streets, childhood lead poisoning prevention, storm drain protection, used motor oil recycling, teen worker rights, among others affecting community members' quality of life.

CCSCLA states that they will conduct further environmental awareness workshops within communities as the need and topics for them present themselves.

=== Public health ===
The environmental justice issues which CCSCLA is involved in raise several concerns along the lines of public health. Because of the close proximity of developments such as incinerators, plants, and/or factories to places in which people live in south central LA, residents are at increased risk of developing health problems relating to prolonged exposure to pollution and toxins.

Part of CCSCLA's work within the community is to raise awareness and promote community engagement of environmental justice issues—this involves not only environmental upkeep and well-being, but the health of residents in these communities as well. CCSCLA hopes that in spreading awareness, health literacy will increase within communities involved.

== Projects/campaigns ==
=== LANCER ===
In the summer of 1985, Robin Cannon and Charlotte Bullock established CCSCLA is response to the proposed construction of the Los Angeles City Energy Recovery (LANCER) municipal waste incinerator. The waste facility would burn million of tons of waste during its operation causing concern for citizens of the pollutants that would be emitted. Cannon and Bullock were concerned South Central Los Angeles was chosen for the incinerator's location because of the community's high unemployment rate, low average income, and high population of people of color. The LANCER was to be built in a vacant lot, near Jefferson High School and a public recreation center in a residential area of 16,000 people. LANCER was estimated to cost $170 million to construct. According to the Los Angeles Times, facility would employ highly trained and specialized personnel that would mostly live outside of the community so its construct would not provide jobs for those living near LANCER. In June 1987, Los Angeles mayor Tom Bradley announced that the LANCER project would not be completed.

=== CCSCLA v. LA Unified School District ===
Fabiola Tostado, Maria Perez, and Nevada Dove, three teenage students living in south central Los Angeles, stood up to protest the development and opening of Jefferson New Middle School, a new school planned to be built in their community. The school was projected to open in 1997—the students were able to hold off its opening until 1998, and also shed light on many problems existing with the school's location.

According to the research the teens did, the building site of the school was located on toxic land and was to be placed across from a former plant which was put on the Superfund cleanup list. Melanie Dove, mother of one of the teens Nevada Dove, was an organizer of Concerned Citizens of South-Central LA at the time, contributing to CCSCLA's involvement in the situation. The teens' actions raised public awareness of the build on toxic land, and brought to light discrepancies in the building company's plans. As a result, a new law was put into place which became effective January 1, 2000, stating: "henceforth, all school sites will be fully evaluated and made safe before school construction ever begins". The Concerned Citizens helped shed light on over 12 other school sites around Los Angeles suffering from similar problems of officials' oversight in constructing in polluted zones. Their efforts garnered the attention of their senator at the time, Tom Hayden (D- Los Angeles), who involved himself with the problem of building schools on contaminated grounds on a federal level.

The issue of building on polluted land is far from solved- the teenagers explained that students ended up attending the community middle school even after concerns were voiced, and experienced symptoms of the pollution negatively affecting their health. In this instance, they were not able to stop the LA Unified School District from the building of Jefferson New Middle School, but their influence extended beyond this instance. This situation brought the movement of environmental justice to light within the south central LA community, and set an empowering example for young people to have the ability to educate themselves and stand up to federal officials ignoring their concerns.

=== Alley clean up program ===
Alleys in CCSCLA's area of concern were considered to be the worst in Los Angeles around the time of its founding. They are used for illegal trash dumping, sites for drug trafficking and crime, and have little to no lighting. Block club participants submitted a petition to the city of Los Angeles demanding that alleys be cleaned, closed to traffic, and fenced off with access only to residents of these communities. This petition resulted in alley clean ups and closures that prevent crime and illegal dumping. CCSCLA also entered into a pilot program with the city of Los Angeles to train community residents, including those formerly incarcerated, to do alley clean up and pothole repair. Fifteen community residents were ultimately given full-time, permanent employment through this pilot program.

=== POWER ===
POWER, or People Organizing for Workplace and Environmental Rights, is a youth program sponsored by CCSCLA since May 1998. POWER is a joint program between Jefferson High School, Fremont High School, and the University of California at Los Angeles- Labor Occupational Safety and Health. CCSCLA worked in conjunction with UCLA-LOSH to create the program curriculum to effectively educate the students on the issues facing their community and to give them the skills to translate the environmental education they receive to action in the community. It is CCSCLA's aim to empower students to take charge of and be responsible for their neighborhood, workplace, school, and home. A notable achievement of the program was the forced closure of a contaminated school site for the entirety of a year while environmental remediation was conducted. The youth received national acclaim for their efforts in Time magazine which published an article titled "Don't Mess Around with the Toxic Crusaders".

=== The Antes Columbus Youth Football Club ===
ACYFC, founded through a partnership between CCSCLA and Los Angeles Metropolitan Churches (LMC) is an effort to bring the community together and provide a positive extracurricular activity for youth. For ages 5–19, the ACYFC provides uniforms, equipment, and team organization with no cost to the players. Taking the club a step further, CCSCLA also implemented training programs for sports related business and jobs including: venue management, broadcast recording and editing, concessions management, referee training, league administration, and manufacturing and retail of uniforms. In addition, CCSCLA has been able to provide two synthetic soccer fields for play in the Vernon Central community. In 2002 CCSCLA helped facilitate the Nike donation of a synthetic field to Ross Snyder Park and facilitated the collection of resources to develop a field for George Washington Carver Middle School.

=== The Entertainment Industry Training Program (EITP) ===
Beginning in 1997, the mission of EITP is to get inner city kids (ages 13–18) acquainted with jobs in the entertainment industry. Kids work with professionals from the industry on a television or film project during workshops twice a week. Topics of the workshops include: producing, writing, directing, set design, production management, location scouting, props, music composing, hair and make-up design, wardrobe, art directing, script supervision, stage direction, camera operation, and video editing etc. Notable projects produced in the past include: public service announcement- "Choices", music video for a neighborhood teen, POWER Youth Documentary, and Fame 2000- stage direction and video taping. The EITP program had been partially sponsored by DreamWorks SKG and Sony Pictures Entertainment.

=== Healthcare for community members affected by pollution created from LANCER ===
Pollution created from LANCER and like projects has severely affected the health of members of South Central Los Angeles communities. Inhabitants of these communities are largely racial and/or ethnic minorities of low-income. Mothers in these communities explain that they and their children already face pre-existing health conditions unable to be addressed because of the cost and accessibility of the current healthcare system—conditions such as asthma, influenza, cancer, heart disease, and/or pneumonia. Ailments of community members are magnified through added health problems caused by pollution in the environment of south-central inhabitants (such as trash-burning from incinerators, chemical exposure from power plants, etc.).

=== Juanita Tate Market Place ===
In April 2014 the Juanita Tate Marketplace opened in Southern Los Angeles in honor of the late Juanita Tate, a member of CCSCLA. The shopping center took nearly two decades to build because of the area's prior neglect. The retail shopping center is built on a brownfield that was formerly a scrap yard and recycling center. In April 2015 the marketplace was sold to private investors.
