= Schoenus tesquorum =

Scientific classification
- Kingdom: Plantae
- Clade: Tracheophytes
- Clade: Angiosperms
- Clade: Monocots
- Clade: Commelinids
- Order: Poales
- Family: Cyperaceae
- Genus: Schoenus
- Species: S. tesquorum

Binomial name
- Schoenus tesquorum J.M Black, 1922
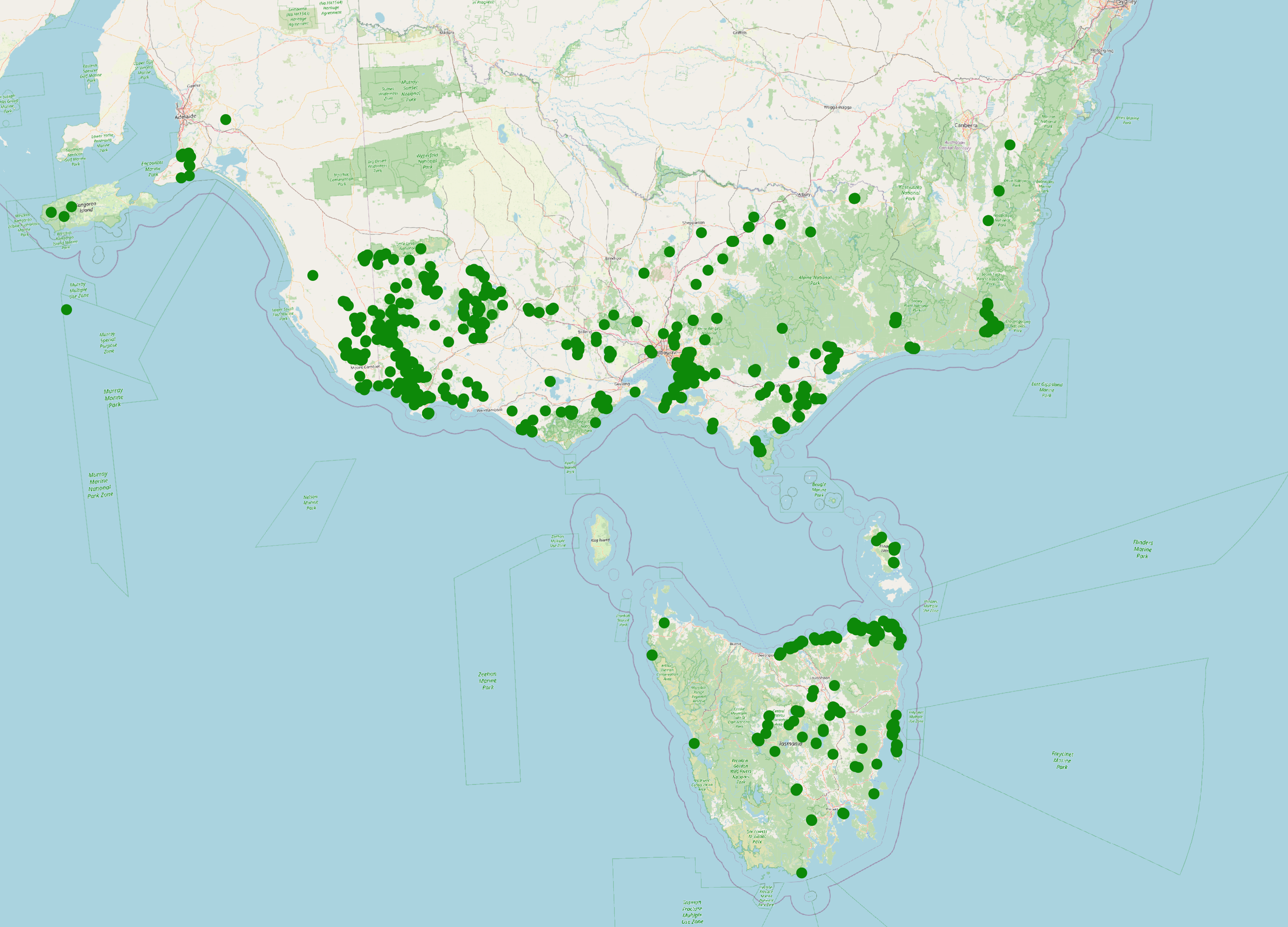
- Map of observations of S. tesquorum in south-eastern Australia. Data from Atlas of Living Australia occurrence download at https://biocache.ala.org.au/occurrences/search?&q=qid%3A1712015609094&disableAllQualityFilters=true accessed on 02 April 2024. Basemap from © OpenStreetMap April 2, 2024

Species of grass-like plant

Schoenus tesquorum is an aquatic sedge belonging to the family Cyperaceae, commonly known as the grassy bog-rush or the soft bogsedge. It is native to southeastern Australia and can be found in various wetland sites. tesquorum comes from the Latin tesqua, meaning 'of rough or wild regions'.

== Description ==
Schoenus tesquorum is a tufted perennial, graminoid in habit, that grows up to 45 centimetres (18 in) in height. Its flowering stems are terete (round) and its blades are up to 30 centimetres (12 in) long. Often confused with the closely related Schoenus apogon, S. tesquorum has smoother nuts, reduced hypogynous bristles - filaments emerging from the fruit of many sedges - and numerous filamentous leaves at the base of the plant. Inflorescences are erect, 2–15 centimetres (0.8–5.9 in) long and brown, consisting of numerous spikelets.

== Distribution and habitat ==
This species has been noted across several studies to be found in a wide range of wetland environments, particularly in Victoria and Tasmania, though it has been observed in southern New South Wales and eastern South Australia. It is a tolerant species, frequently observed in inland freshwater systems at elevations above 1,000 metres (3,281 ft) - such as around Tasmania's highland Lakes, and down to sea level, where it has also been found on saline lagoons.
