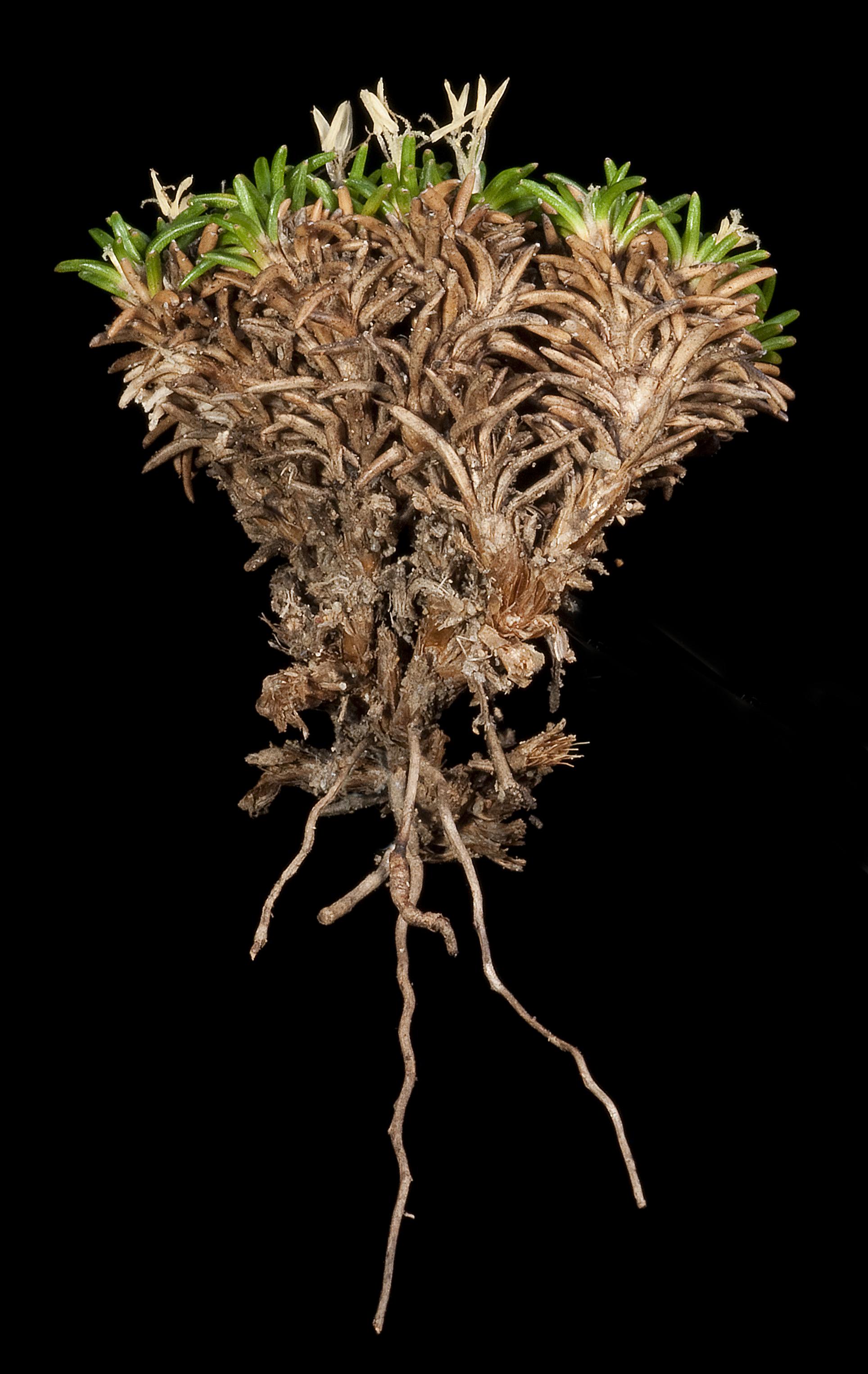

Scientific classification
- Kingdom: Plantae
- Clade: Tracheophytes
- Clade: Angiosperms
- Clade: Monocots
- Clade: Commelinids
- Order: Poales
- Family: Cyperaceae
- Genus: Schoenus
- Species: S. calcatus

Binomial name
- Schoenus calcatus K.L.Wilson

= Schoenus calcatus =

Species of grass-like plant

Schoenus calcatus is a species of Cyperaceae endemic to Western Australia.

== Description ==
S. calcatus is a small cushion-forming perennial. The leaves are spirally arranged and have both a short blade and a short sheath.

== Taxonomy ==
Schoenus calcatus was first described in 1997 by Karen Wilson. There are no synonyms. The specific epithet calcatus, is derived from the Latin verb, calcare, 'to tread upon' or 'walk over' and refers to a potential threat to the species.

== Gallery ==
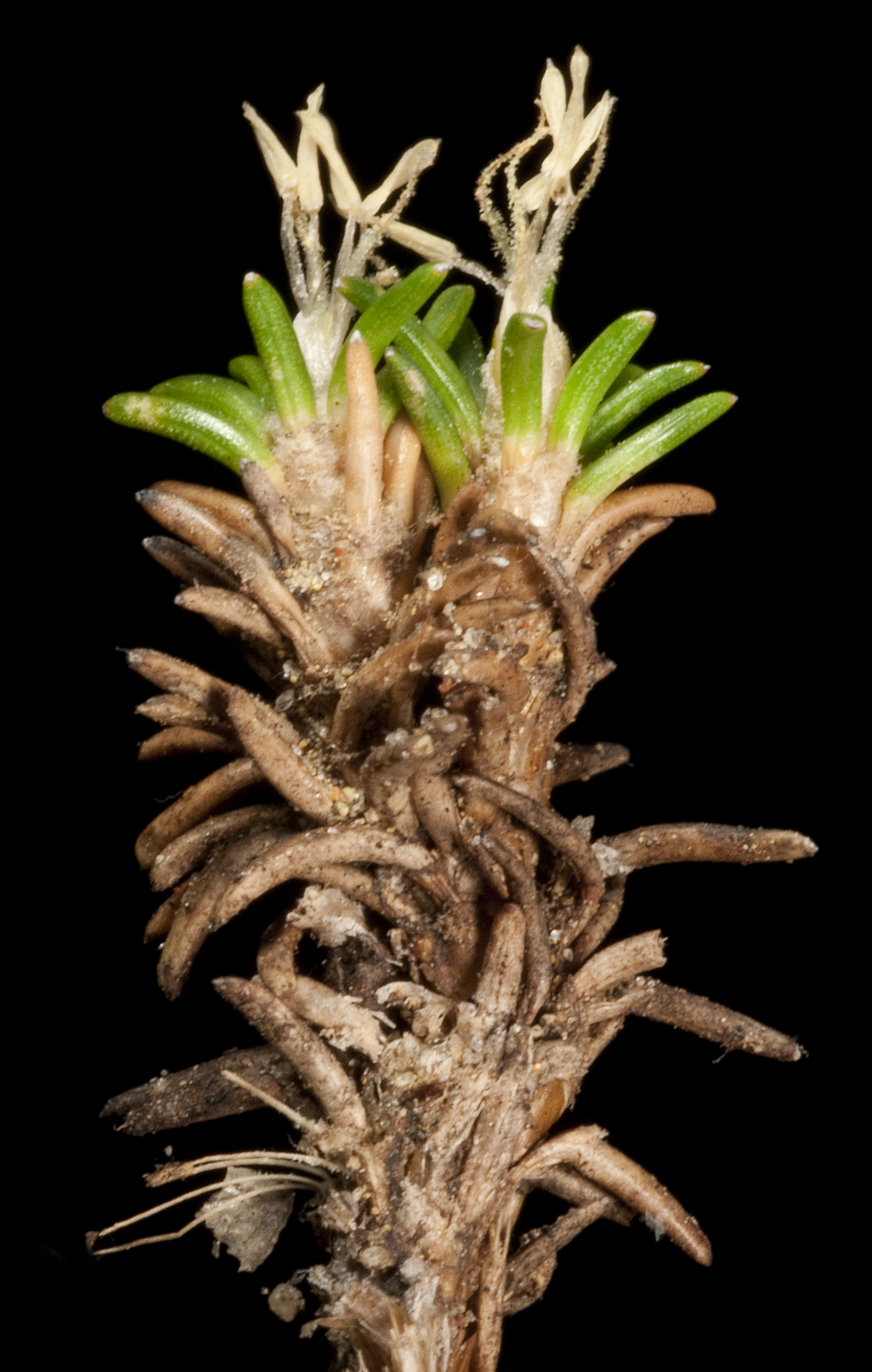

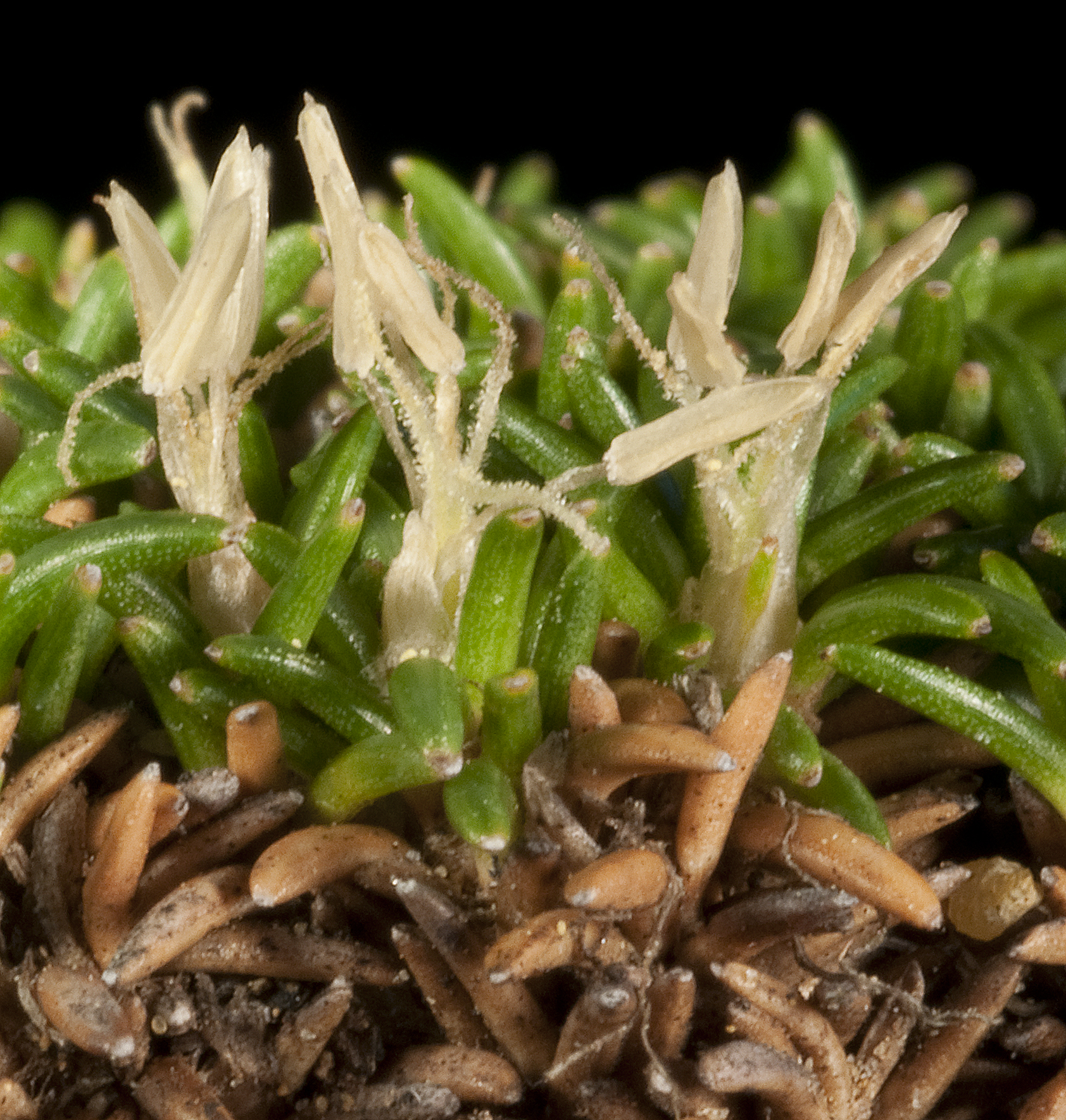
