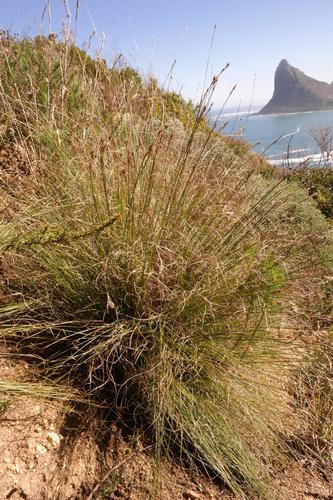
- Grassleaf veldrush

Scientific classification
- Kingdom: Plantae
- Clade: Tracheophytes
- Clade: Angiosperms
- Clade: Monocots
- Clade: Commelinids
- Order: Poales
- Family: Cyperaceae
- Genus: Schoenus
- Species: S. graminifolius

Binomial name
- Schoenus graminifolius (Levyns) T.L.Elliott & Muasya
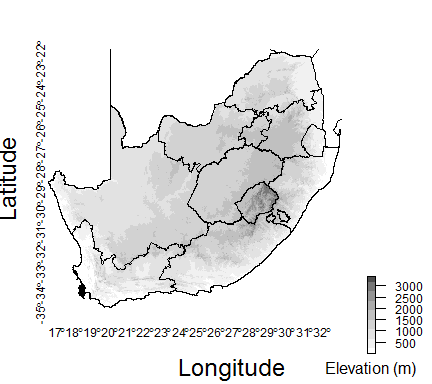
- Documented collection localities in South Africa

Synonyms
- Tetraria graminifolia Levyns

= Schoenus graminifolius =

Species of grass-like plant

Schoenus graminifolius is a species of sedge endemic to the Cape Peninsula of South Africa.

== Description ==
The main distinguishing characters of S. graminifolius are its papery (chartaceous) spikelet glumes that have reddish-purplish streaking throughout. Another key character of S. graminifolius is that its lower primary inflorescence bracts are widened at the base. Schoenus auritus also has lower primary inflorescence bracts that are widened at the base; however, that species has firmer glumes.

The basal leaves of S. graminifolius are usually relatively long and grass-like, so that they are almost as long or longer than the flowering stems.

Similar to other sedges, plants in this group are very difficult to identify. It appears that part of this problem is caused by the tendency of the southern African Schoenus to form hybrids with each other. Schoenus graminifolius does not appear to form hybrids with other southern African Schoenus species.

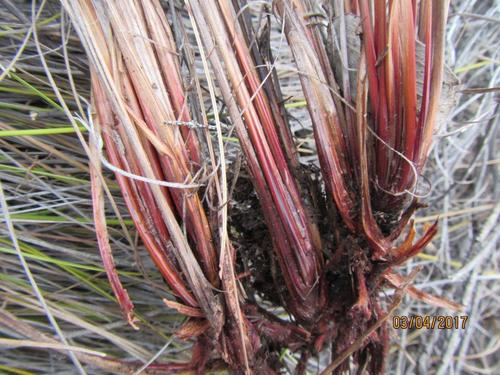
Base of flowering stems (culms)

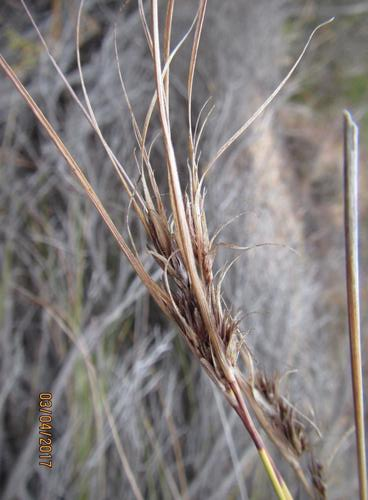
Flowering head (inflorescence)

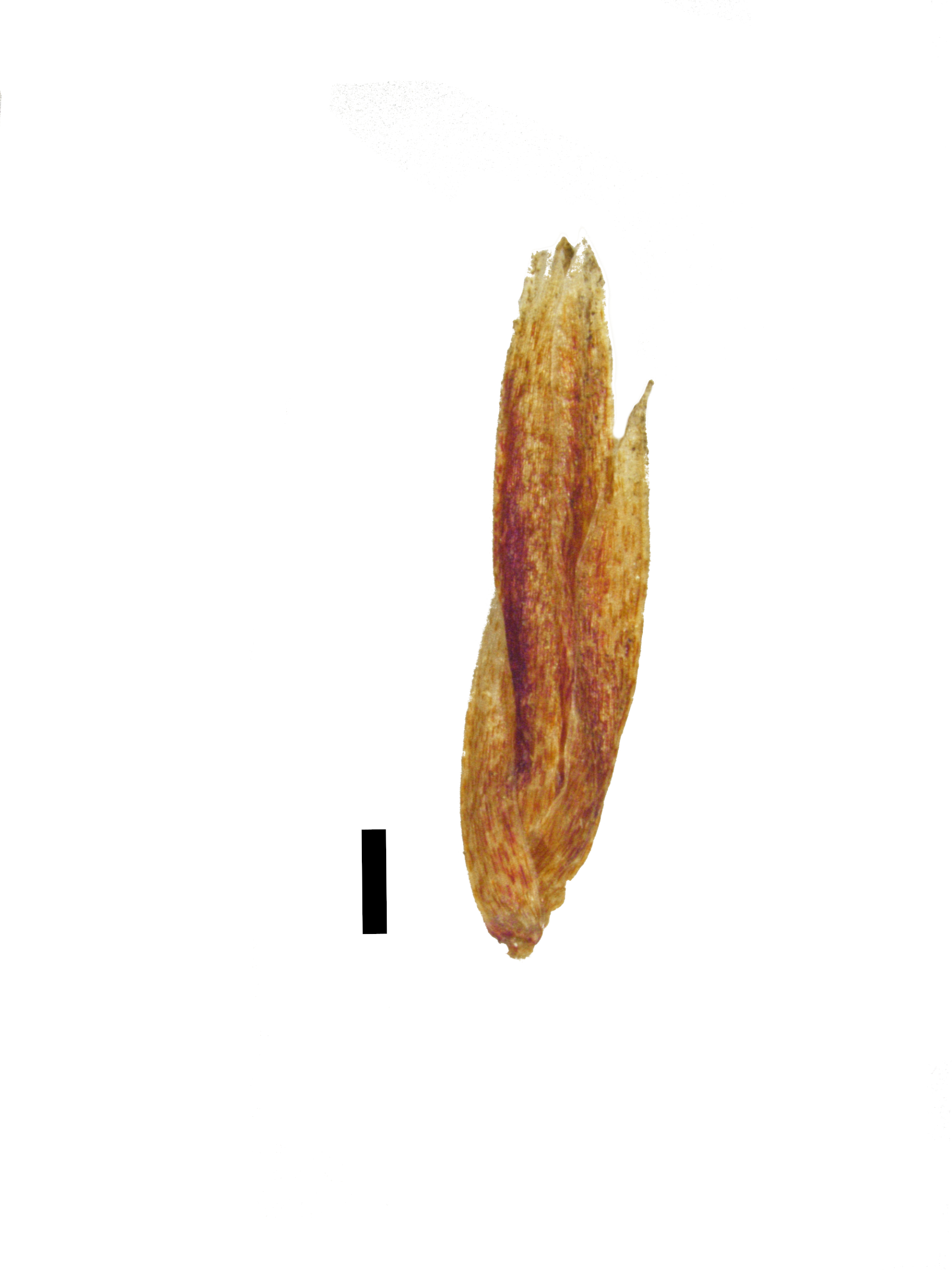
Spikelet (the black scale bar represents 1 mm)

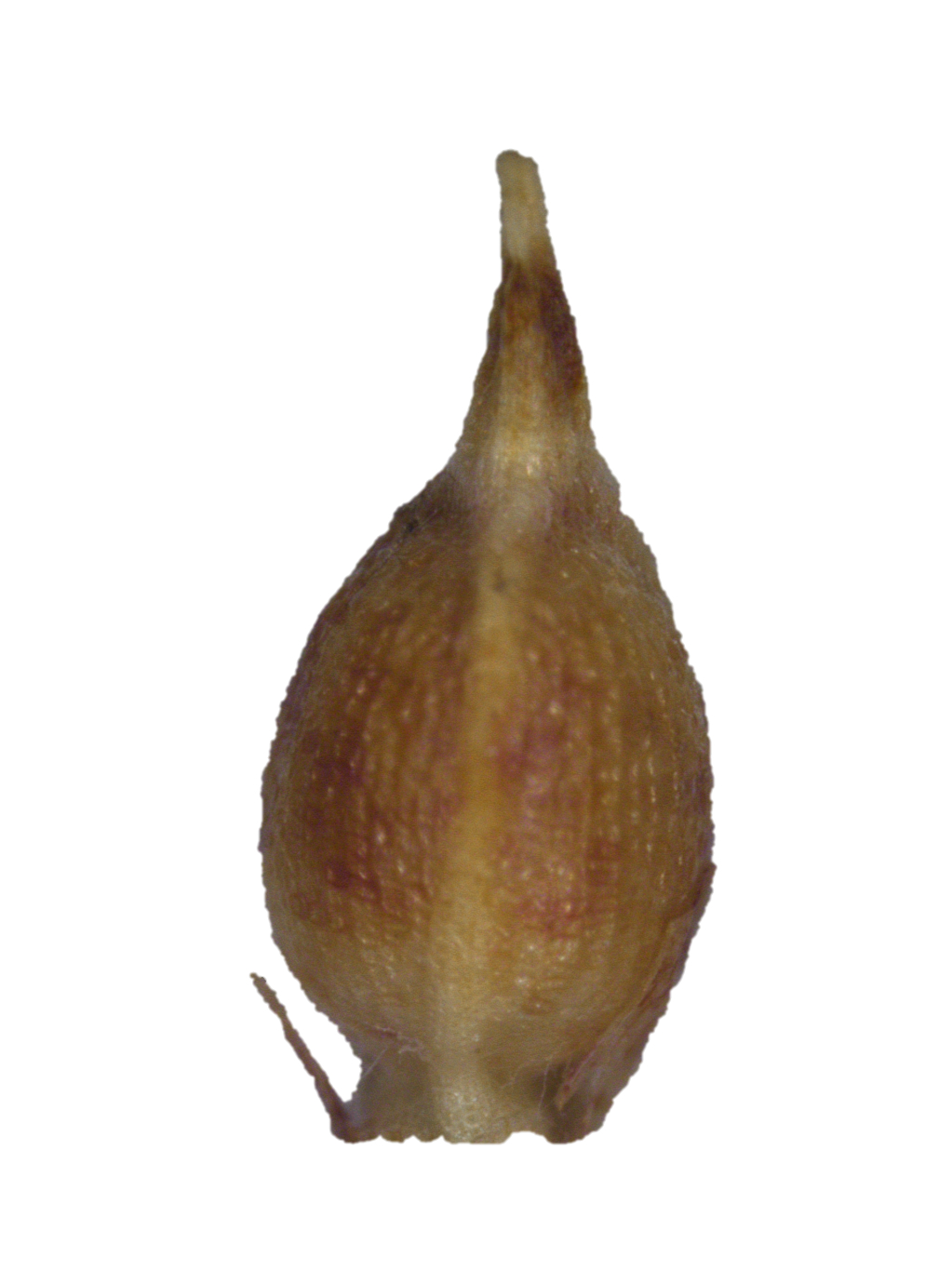
Nutlet

== Taxonomy ==
Schoenus graminifolius is a species in family Cyperaceae, tribe Schoeneae. Other notable genera in tribe Schoeneae include Lepidosperma, Oreobolus, Costularia, Tetraria and Gahnia. The most closely related species to S. graminifolius are other southern African Schoenus species, specifically, species in the S. cuspidatus and allies group.

Southern African Schoenus were once classified as Tetraria; however, based on molecular and morphological differences, we now know that the two groups are evolutionary distinct. To ensure that this group of sedges is monophyletic (i.e. the genus only has closely related species), several species of Epischoenus and the southern African Tetraria were transferred into Schoenus. In the field, the southern African Schoenus can be distinguished from Tetraria species by their lack of stem leaves and the absence of reticulate sheaths at the bases of the flowering stems.

== Distribution and habitat ==
Schoenus graminifolius has been found growing on granitic soils at elevations greater than 120 m. To date, it is only known from the Cape Peninsula.

== Images ==
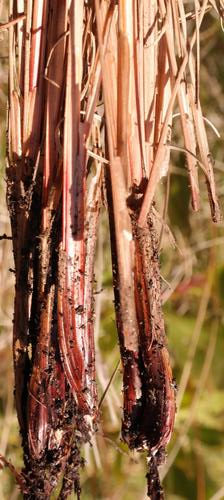
Bases of flowering stems

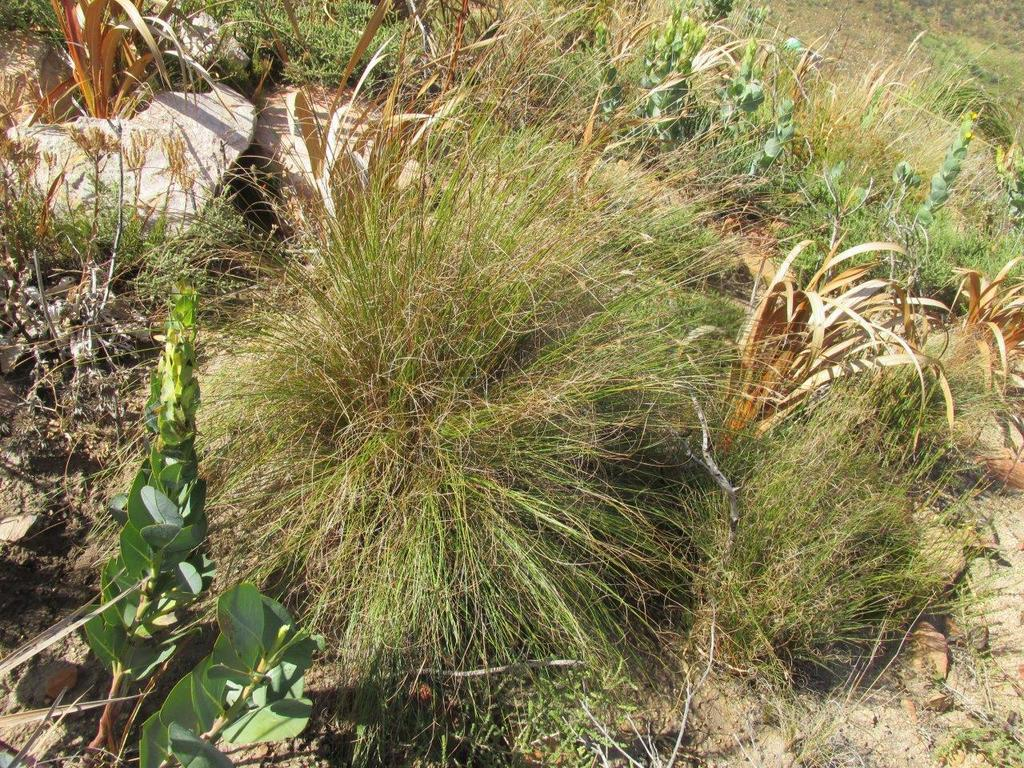
Growth form

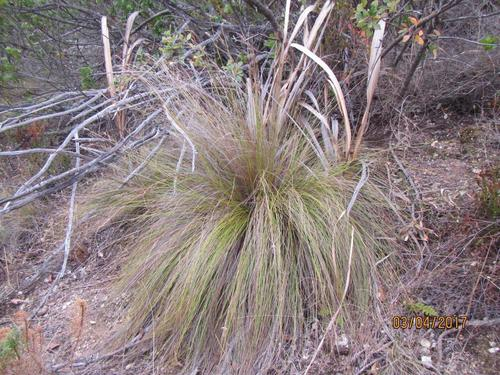
Growth form

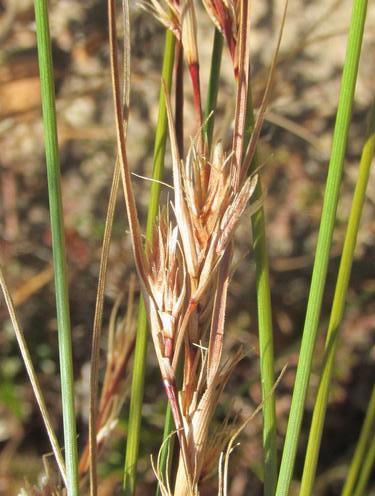
Flowering heads
