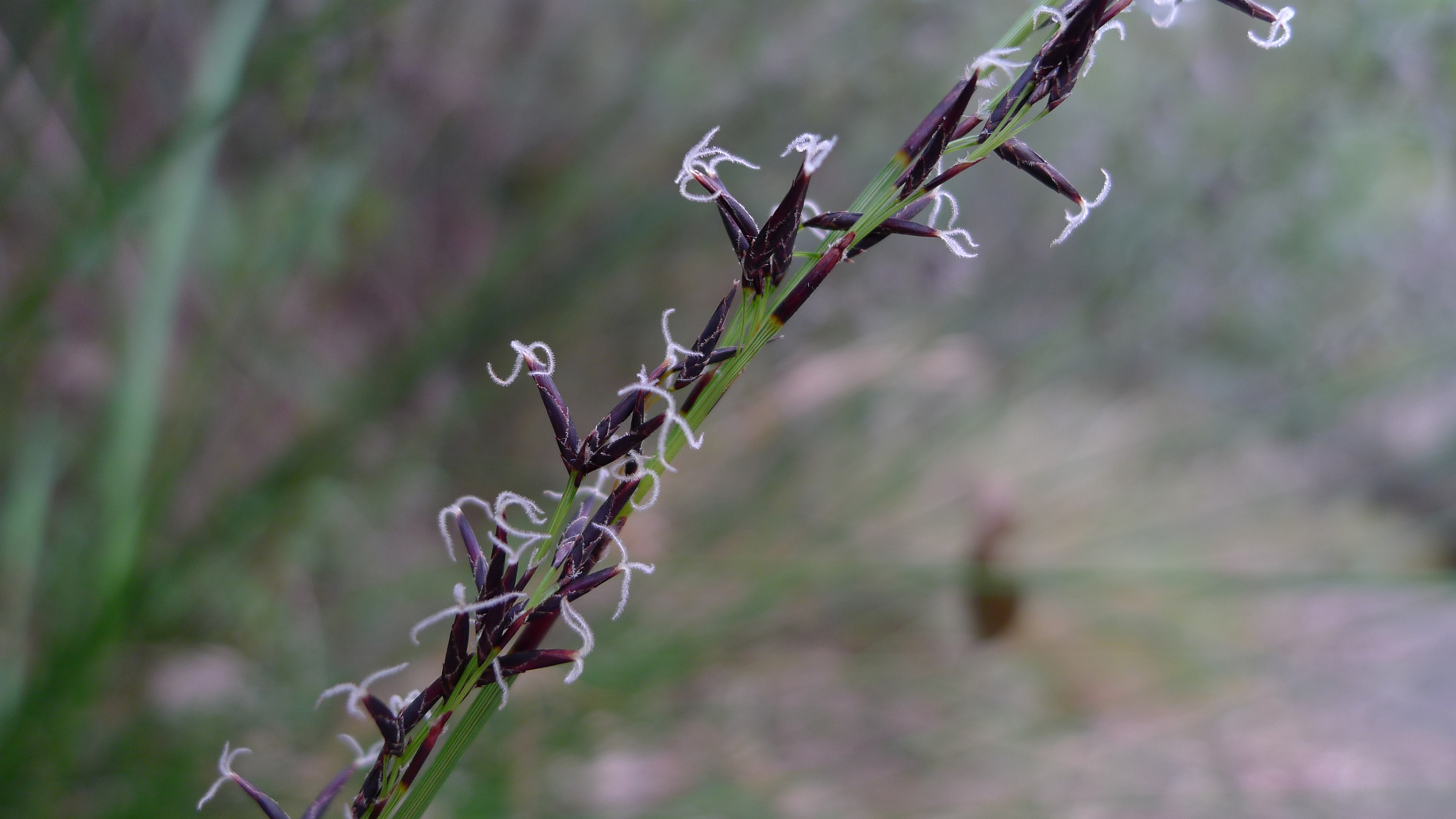
- S. melanostachys flowering in August in New South Wales, Australia

Scientific classification
- Kingdom: Plantae
- Clade: Embryophytes
- Clade: Tracheophytes
- Clade: Angiosperms
- Clade: Monocots
- Clade: Commelinids
- Order: Poales
- Family: Cyperaceae
- Genus: Schoenus
- Species: S. melanostachys

Binomial name
- Schoenus melanostachys R.Br.

= Schoenus melanostachys =

Black bog-rush

Species of grass-like plant

Schoenus melanostachys is a species of sedge within the Schoenus or bogrush genus that is endemic to east coast Australia. It only grows in areas that are at least seasonally damp, often in clearings in forest or moist rocks. Defining features include bigtussocks. Flowers during spring and summer.

== Etymology ==
The genus Schoenus is named after an ancient Egyptian unit of measure that was based upon tied reeds. Melanostachys is composed of the Greek melano meaning very dark, and stachys meaning spike or catkin from Greek στάχυς.
