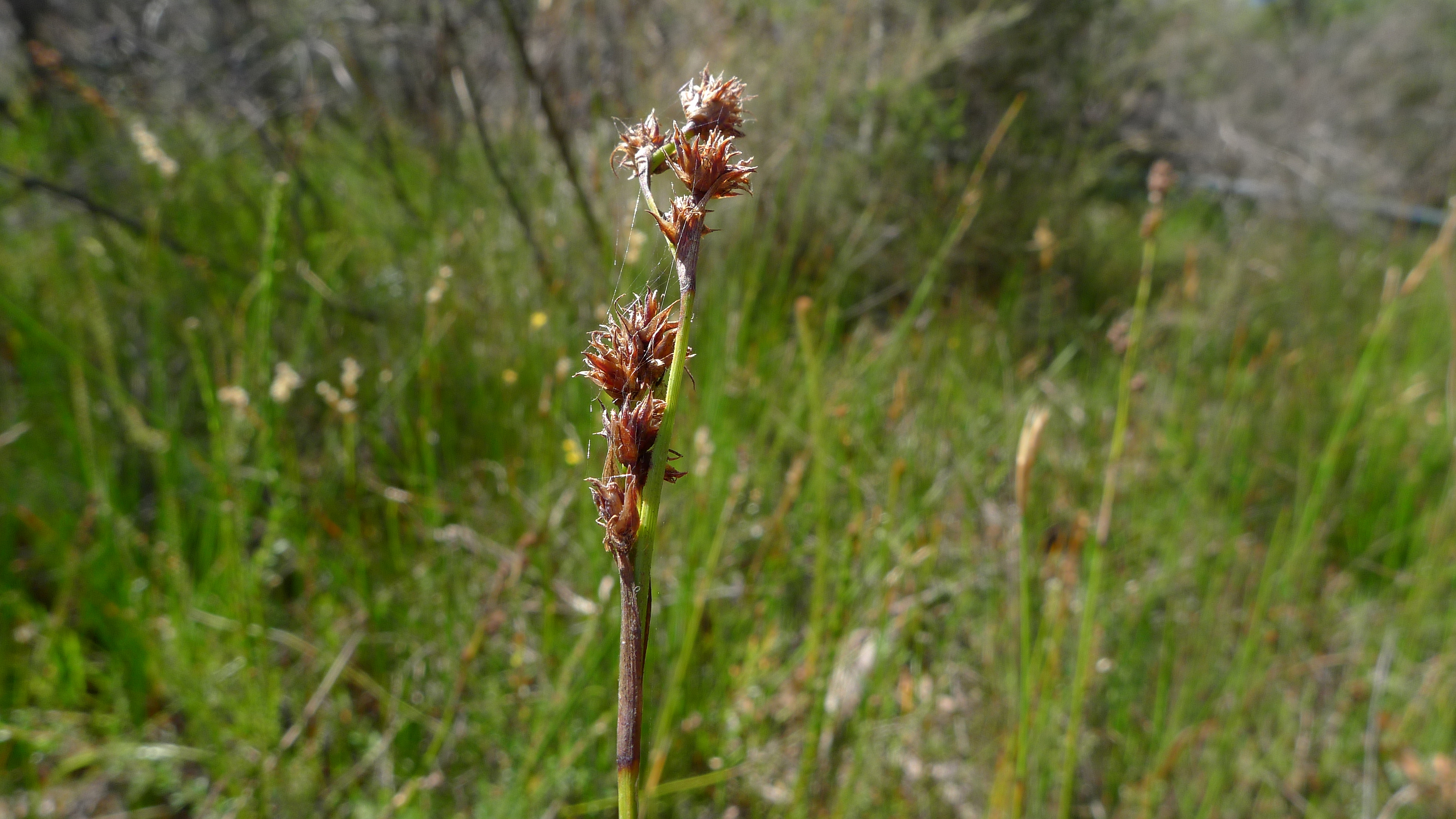

Scientific classification
- Kingdom: Plantae
- Clade: Tracheophytes
- Clade: Angiosperms
- Clade: Monocots
- Clade: Commelinids
- Order: Poales
- Family: Cyperaceae
- Genus: Schoenus
- Species: S. villosus

Binomial name
- Schoenus villosus R.Br.

= Schoenus villosus =

Hairy bog-rush

Species of grass-like plant

Schoenus villosus, known as the hairy bog-rush, is a species of sedge native to Australia. A tufted perennial grass-like plant growing from 15 to 40 cm tall. The stem is grooved, 1.2 to 1.7 mm wide. Found near the coast or nearby ranges in Queensland and New South Wales. Growing in heath or woodland, on sandy soils. The specific epithet villosus is derived from Latin, meaning "hairy". One of the many plants first published by Robert Brown with the type known as "(J.) v.v." Appearing in his Prodromus Florae Novae Hollandiae et Insulae Van Diemen in 1810.
