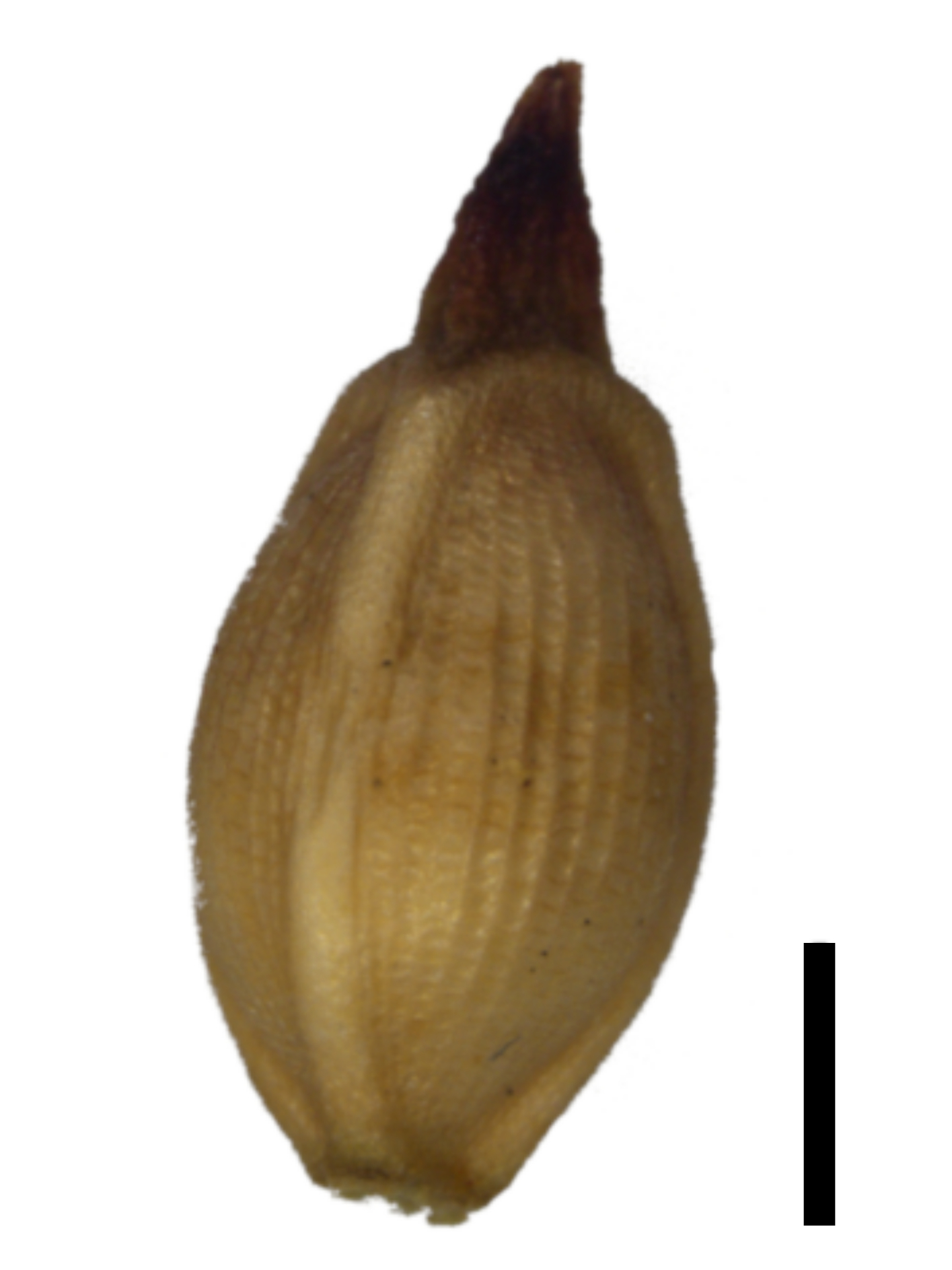
- nut of the hairy bog-rush

Scientific classification
- Kingdom: Plantae
- Clade: Tracheophytes
- Clade: Angiosperms
- Clade: Monocots
- Clade: Commelinids
- Order: Poales
- Family: Cyperaceae
- Genus: Schoenus
- Species: S. vaginatus

Binomial name
- Schoenus vaginatus F.Muell.

= Schoenus vaginatus =

Hairy bog-rush

Species of grass-like plant

Schoenus vaginatus, known as the hairy bog-rush, is a species of sedge native to Australia. A tufted perennial grass-like plant growing from 30 to 60 cm tall. The stem is round in cross section, 0.9 to 1.5 mm wide. Found in rocky sloping areas in northern New South Wales and Queensland. The specific epithet vaginatus is derived from Latin, meaning "sheath".
