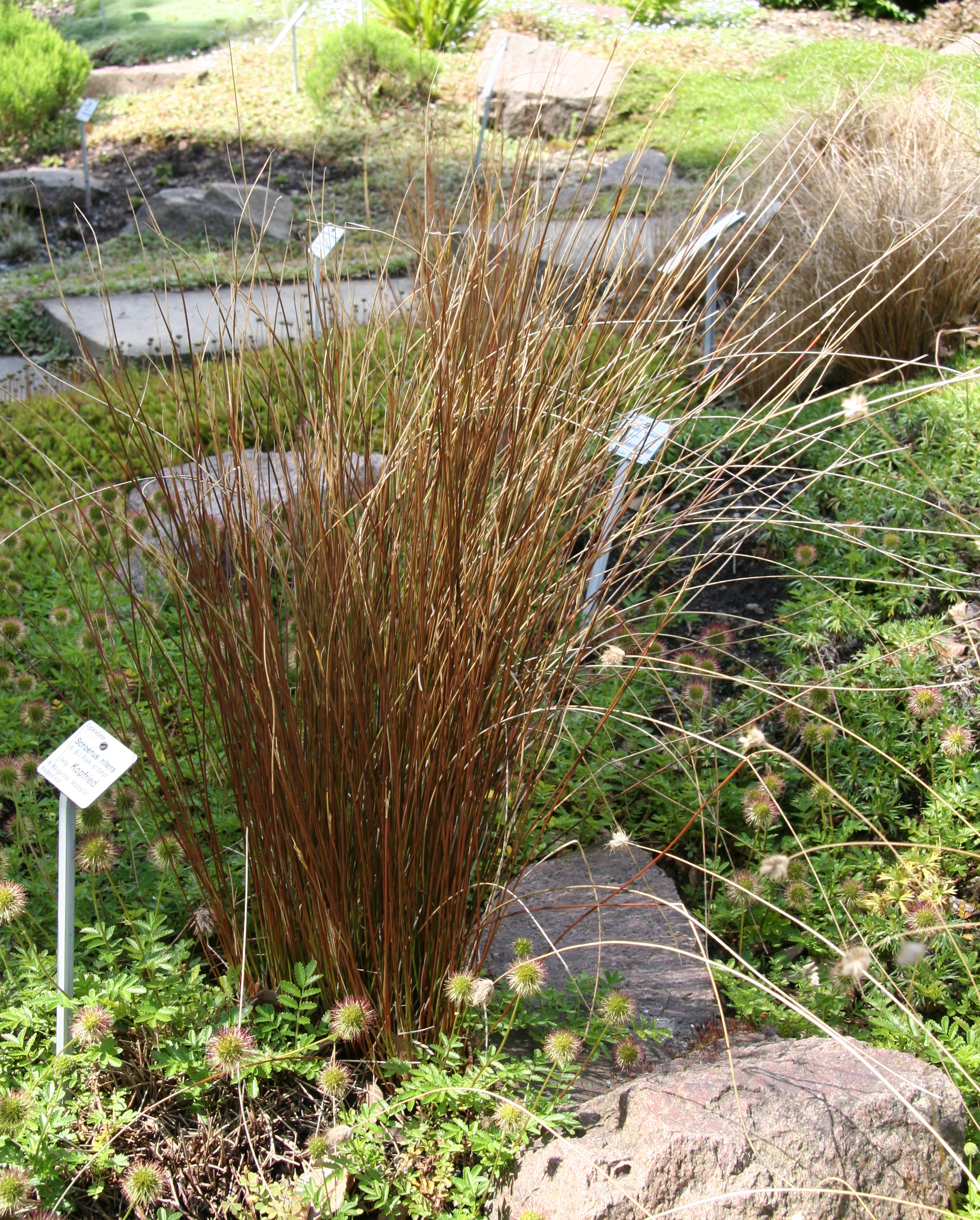

Scientific classification
- Kingdom: Plantae
- Clade: Embryophytes
- Clade: Tracheophytes
- Clade: Spermatophytes
- Clade: Angiosperms
- Clade: Monocots
- Clade: Commelinids
- Order: Poales
- Family: Cyperaceae
- Genus: Schoenus
- Species: S. nitens

Binomial name
- Schoenus nitens (R.Br.) Roem. & Schult.

Synonyms
- Schoenus nitens var. major Ewart & Jean White; Schoenus nitens var. concinnus (Hook.f.) Cheeseman

= Schoenus nitens =

Shiny bog-rush

Species of grass-like plant

Schoenus nitens, known as the shiny bog-rush, is a species of sedge native to Australia. A small perennial grass-like plant growing from 15 to 35 cm tall. The stem is cylindrical, 0.5 to 1 mm wide. Often seen in seasonally moist habitats, near beaches or brackish water near the coast. Occasionally seen inland in swampy, wet areas near lakes. The specific epithet nitens is derived from Latin, meaning shiny".
