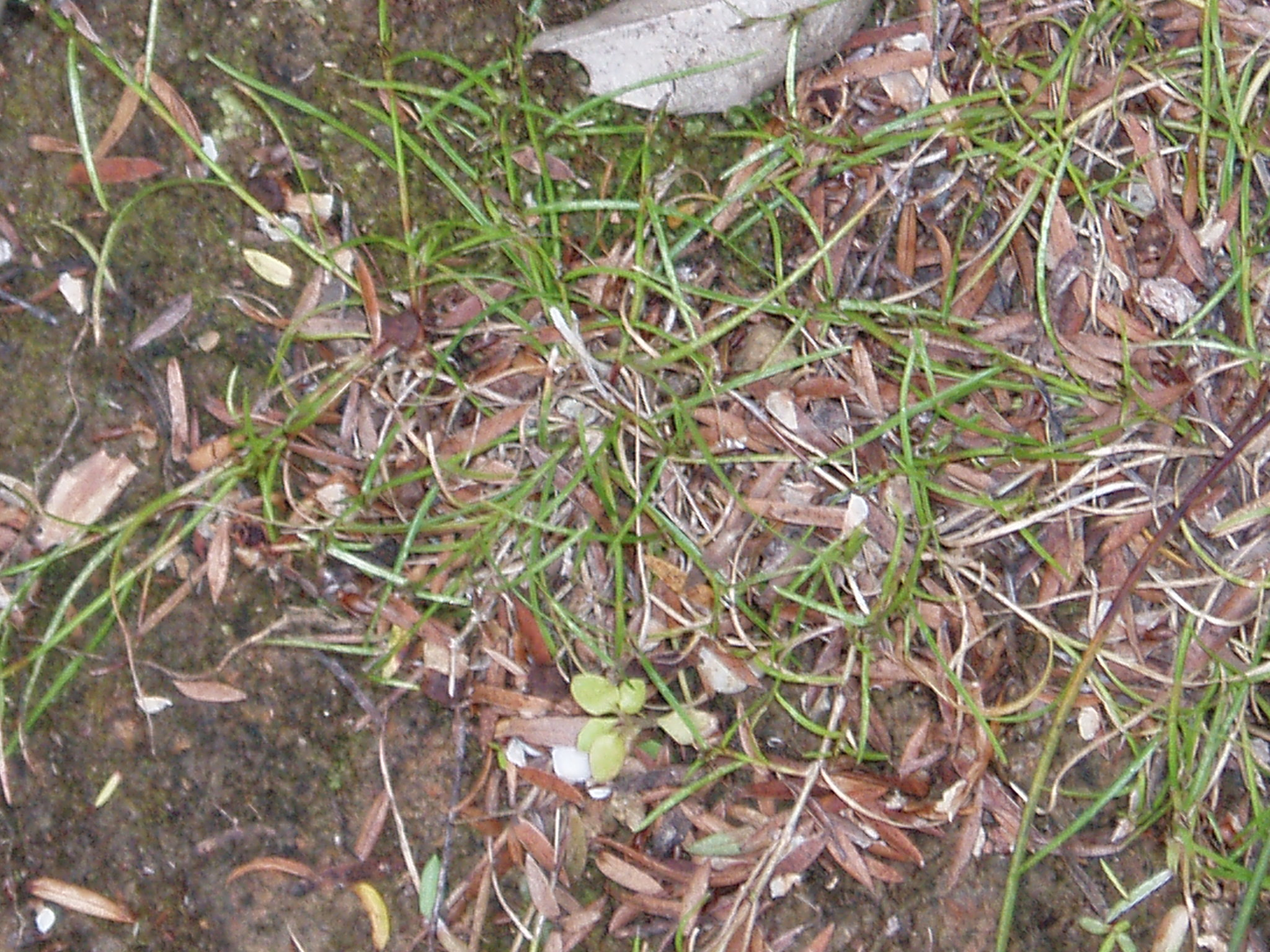

Scientific classification
- Kingdom: Plantae
- Clade: Tracheophytes
- Clade: Angiosperms
- Clade: Monocots
- Clade: Commelinids
- Order: Poales
- Family: Cyperaceae
- Genus: Schoenus
- Species: S. maschalinus

Binomial name
- Schoenus maschalinus Roem. & Schult.

Synonyms
- Chaetospora axillaris R.Br.

= Schoenus maschalinus =

dwarf bog-rush

Species of grass-like plant

Schoenus maschalinus, the dwarf bog-rush is a sedge native to Australia, New Zealand and Malesia. A small, creeping grass like herb, often forming a mat. Stems grow from 10 to 20 cm long. Leaves are usually less than 1mm wide. The habitat is mostly moist swampy areas not far from the coast. The specific epithet maschalinus is derived from Greek, referring to the presence of axils, literally "armpits".
