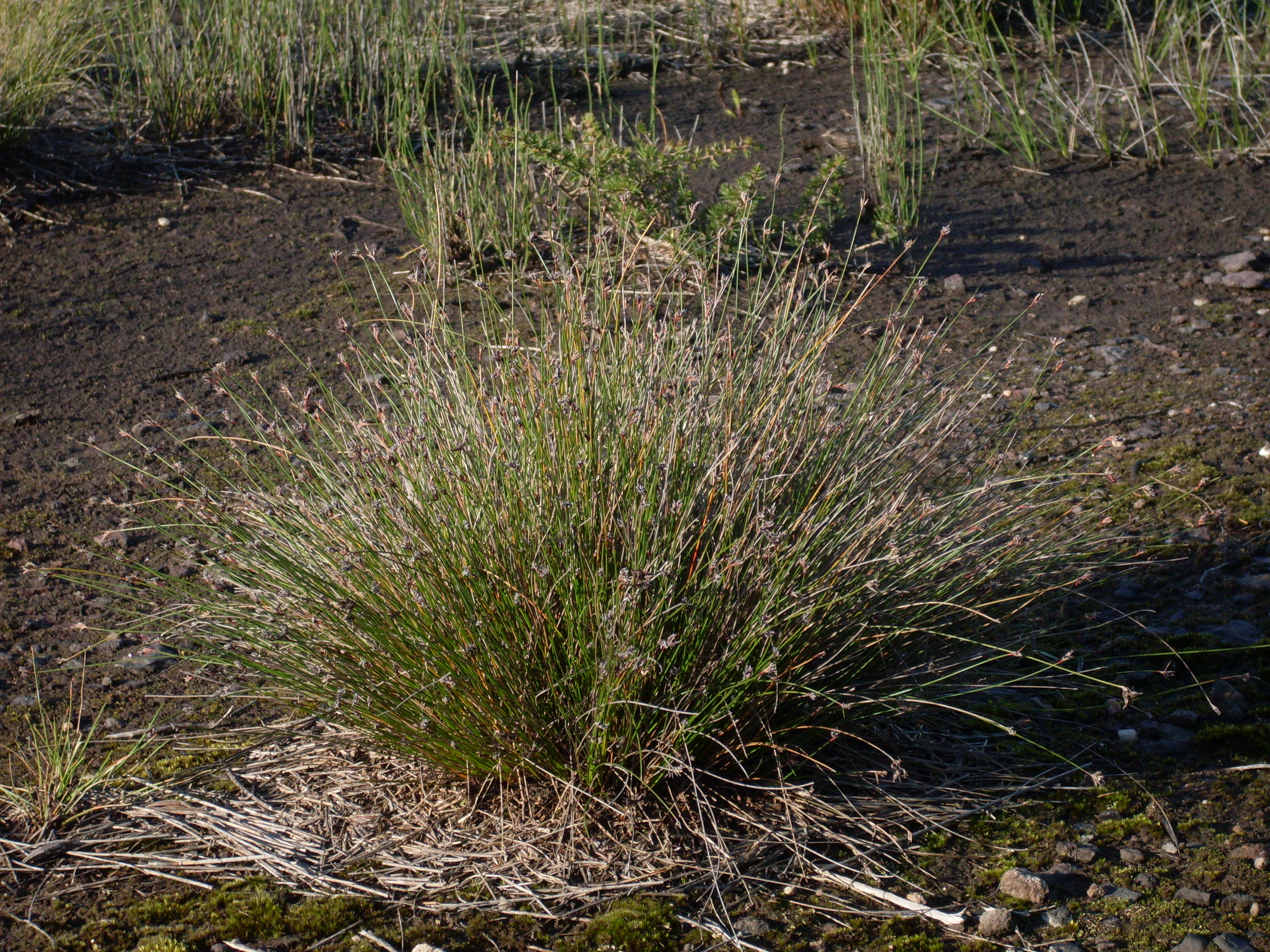

Scientific classification
- Kingdom: Plantae
- Clade: Tracheophytes
- Clade: Angiosperms
- Clade: Monocots
- Clade: Commelinids
- Order: Poales
- Family: Cyperaceae
- Genus: Schoenus
- Species: S. imberbis

Binomial name
- Schoenus imberbis R.Br.

= Schoenus imberbis =

beardless bog-rush

Species of grass-like plant

Schoenus imberbis, the beardless bog rush, is a species of sedge within the genus Schoenus, found in the states of Victoria and New South Wales in Australia. Often seen growing in dry eucalyptus forest or heath on sandy soils. This is one of the many plants first published by Robert Brown with the type known as "(J.) v.v." It appears in his Prodromus Florae Novae Hollandiae et Insulae Van Diemen in 1810.
