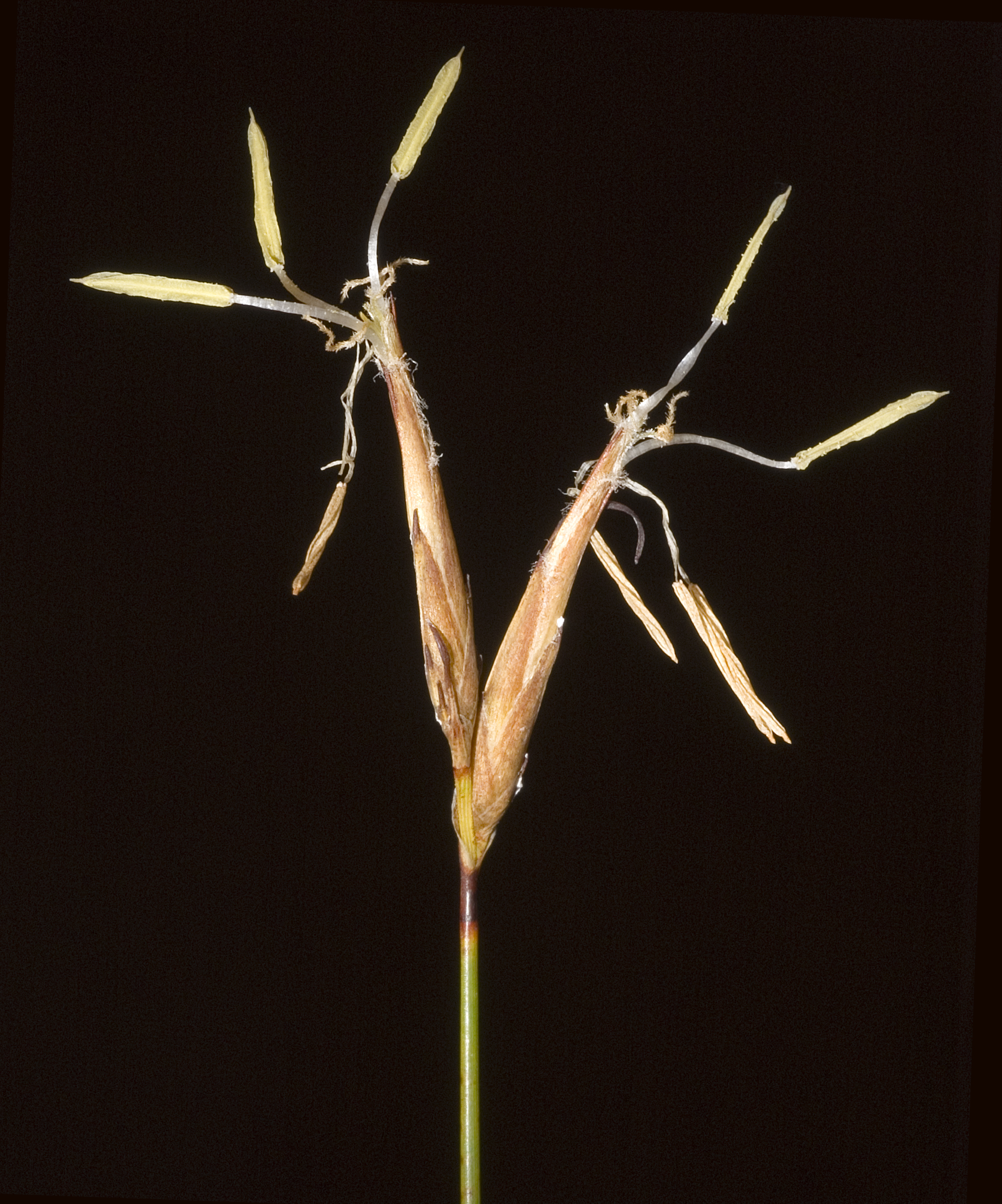

Scientific classification
- Kingdom: Plantae
- Clade: Tracheophytes
- Clade: Angiosperms
- Clade: Monocots
- Clade: Commelinids
- Order: Poales
- Family: Cyperaceae
- Genus: Schoenus
- Species: S. pedicellatus

Binomial name
- Schoenus pedicellatus (R.Br.) Poir.

= Schoenus pedicellatus =

Species of grass-like plant

Schoenus pedicellatus is a species in family Cyperaceae, first described by Robert Brown in 1810 as Chaetospora pedicellata, but assigned to the genus, Schoenus, in 1811 by Jean Louis Marie Poiret. Note that GBIF and Plants of the World Online both give the genus change as being by Roem. (Johann Jacob Roemer) & Schult. (Josef August Schultes) However the species is Australian and the text by Poiret is earlier than that of Roemer and Schultes.

It is a tufted sedge growing in clumps of up to 0.2 m and flowers from July to December or January. It is endemic to Western Australia, where it is found growing on various sands.
