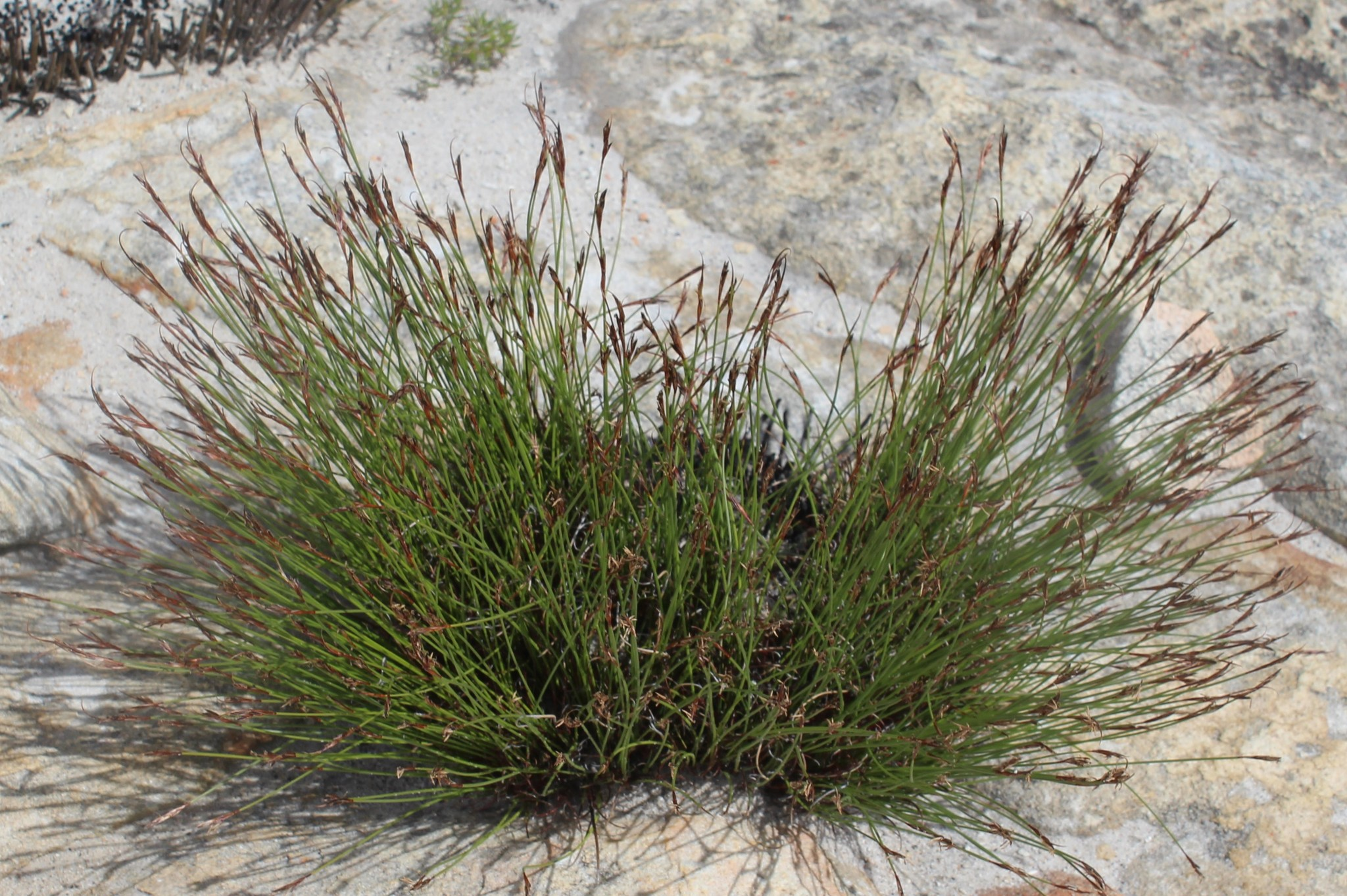
- Wiry veldrush

Scientific classification
- Kingdom: Plantae
- Clade: Tracheophytes
- Clade: Angiosperms
- Clade: Monocots
- Clade: Commelinids
- Order: Poales
- Family: Cyperaceae
- Genus: Schoenus
- Species: S. filiculmis

Binomial name
- Schoenus filiculmis T.L.Elliott & Muasya
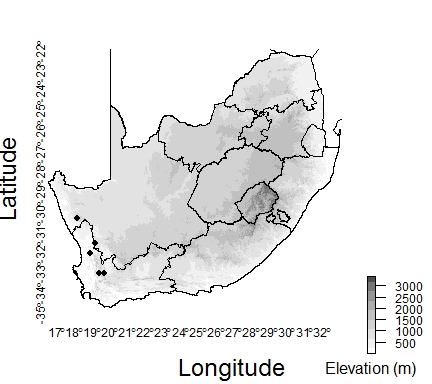
- Documented collection localities

= Schoenus filiculmis =

Species of grass-like plant

Schoenus filiculmis is a species of sedge endemic to the western mountains of the Western Cape and Northern Cape Provinces of South Africa.

== Diagnostic characters ==
Key diagnostic characters of S. filiculmis are its relatively short stature (<275 mm) and thin leaves and flowering stems. The leaves are generally less than 0.5 mm in width, whereas the width of the flowering stems is less than 0.8 mm. The flowering stem (inflorescence) of S. filiculmis is generally quite small and delicate, with a length less than 28.5 mm long and a width less than 4.6 mm. The primary inflorescence bracts are relatively short compared to most Southern African Schoenus species; however, they do have slight lateral membranaceous extensions similar to species such as Schoenus pseudoloreus. Finally, the leaf sheaths and inflorescences can be dark red to almost black in some specimens of S. filiculmis.

The narrow flowering stems and leaves of S. filiculmis, as well as its delicate inflorescences with short primary inflorescence bracts distinguish this species from others in the Schoenus compar – Schoenus pictus group. This key characters of this species are also unique from others in the Schoenus cuspidatus and allies and Epischoenus groups, which are the other two main groups of Southern African Schoenus species.

Similar to other sedges, plants in this group are very difficult to identify. It appears that part of this problem is caused by the tendency of the southern African Schoenus to form hybrids with each other. However, hybridization is yet to be observed in S. filiculmis.

The mature nutlet of S. filiculmis is also yet to be observed.

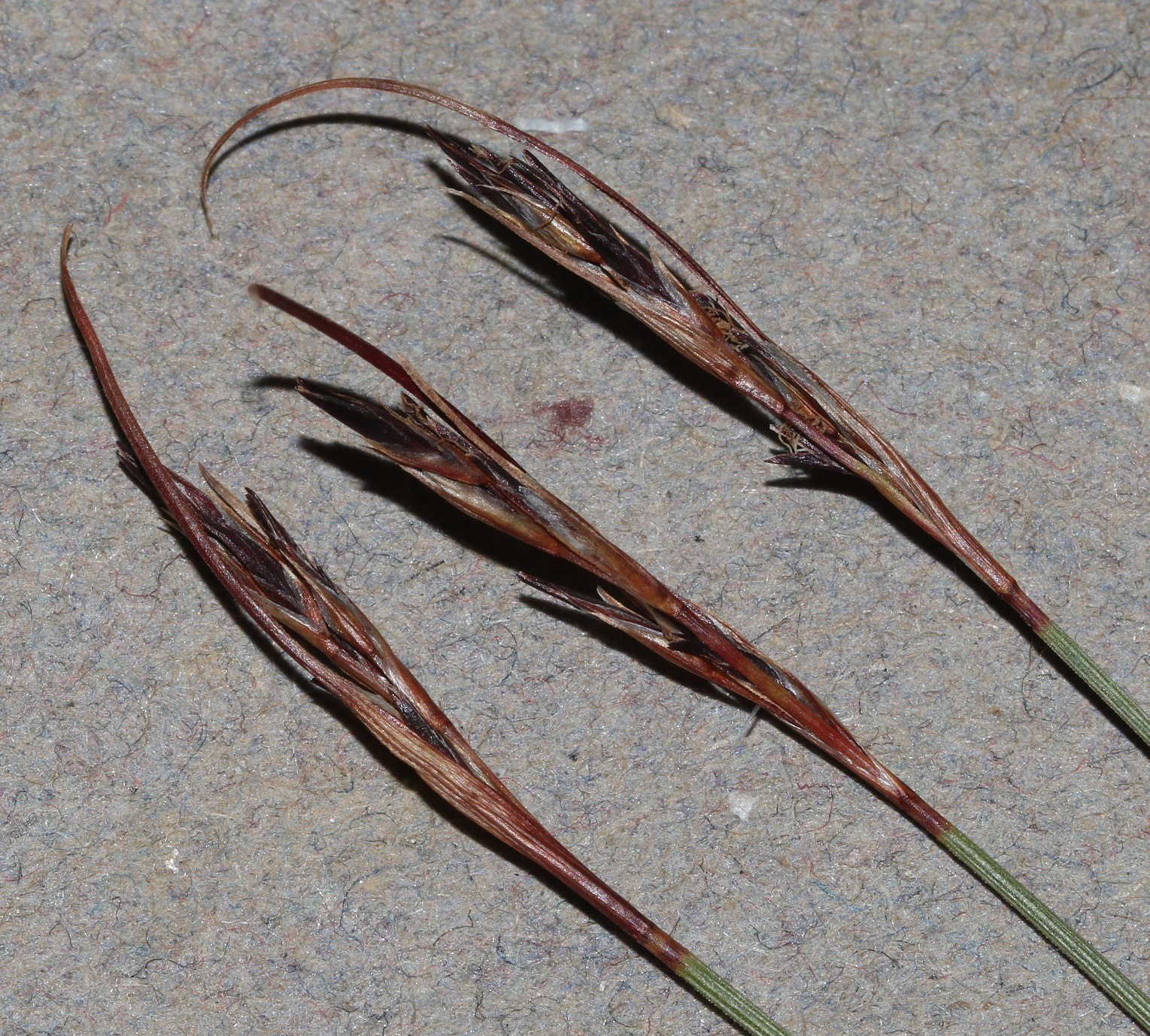
Flowering heads

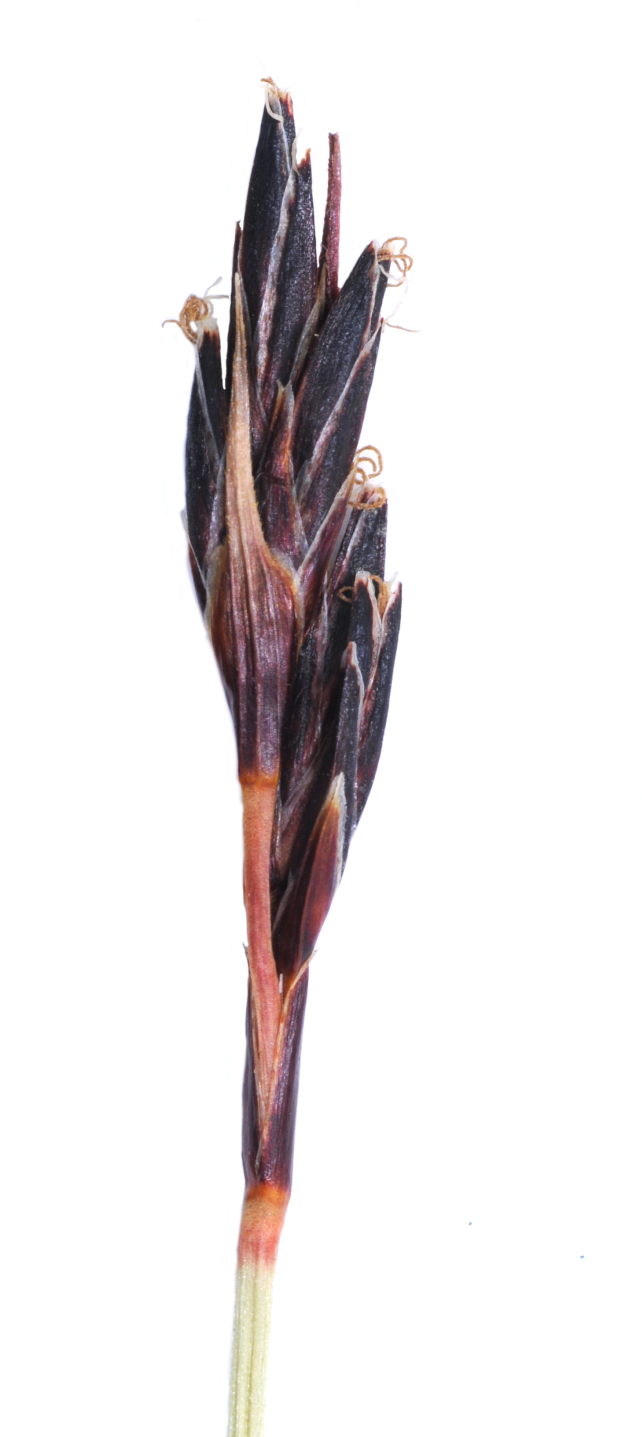
Flowering head

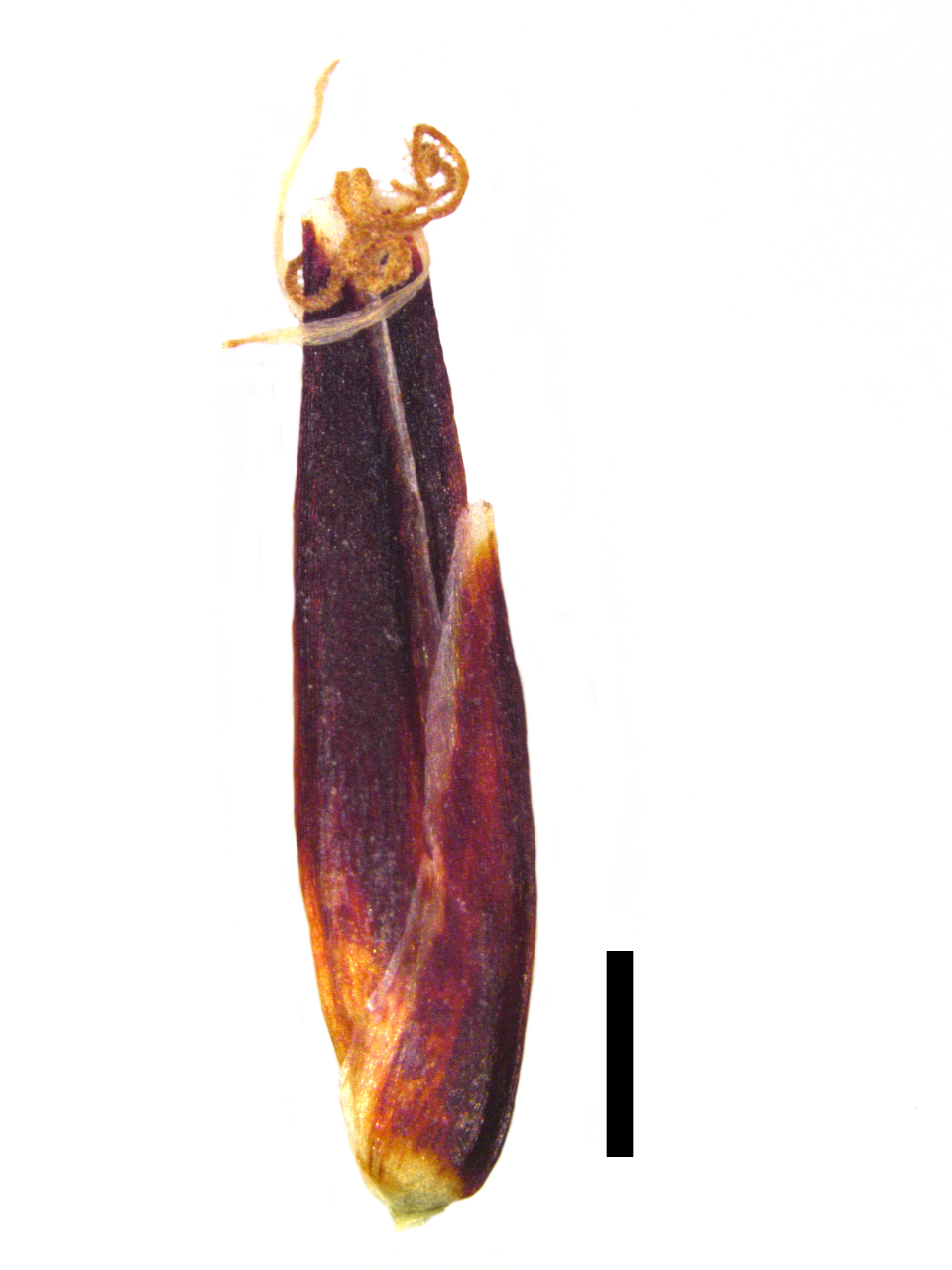
Spikelet

== Taxonomy ==
Schoenus filiculmis is a species in family Cyperaceae, tribe Schoeneae. Other notable genera in tribe Schoeneae include Lepidosperma, Oreobolus, Costularia, Tetraria and Gahnia. Preliminary evidence suggests that although S. filiculmis shares some morphological characters with the S. compar – S. pictus group (e.g. primary inflorescence bracts with lateral membranes), its evolutionary origin is slightly different.

Southern African Schoenus were once classified as Tetraria; however, based on molecular and morphological differences, we now know that the two groups are evolutionary distinct. To ensure that this group of sedges is monophyletic (i.e. the genus only has closely related species), several species of Epischoenus and the southern African Tetraria were transferred into Schoenus. In the field, the southern African Schoenus can be distinguished from Tetraria species by their lack of stem leaves and the absence of reticulate sheaths at the bases of the flowering stems.

== Distribution and ecology ==
Schoenus filiculmis grows in the western mountains of the Northern Cape and Western Cape Provinces of South Africa. This species generally grows within wet to arid fynbos vegetation on mountain slopes.

== Images ==
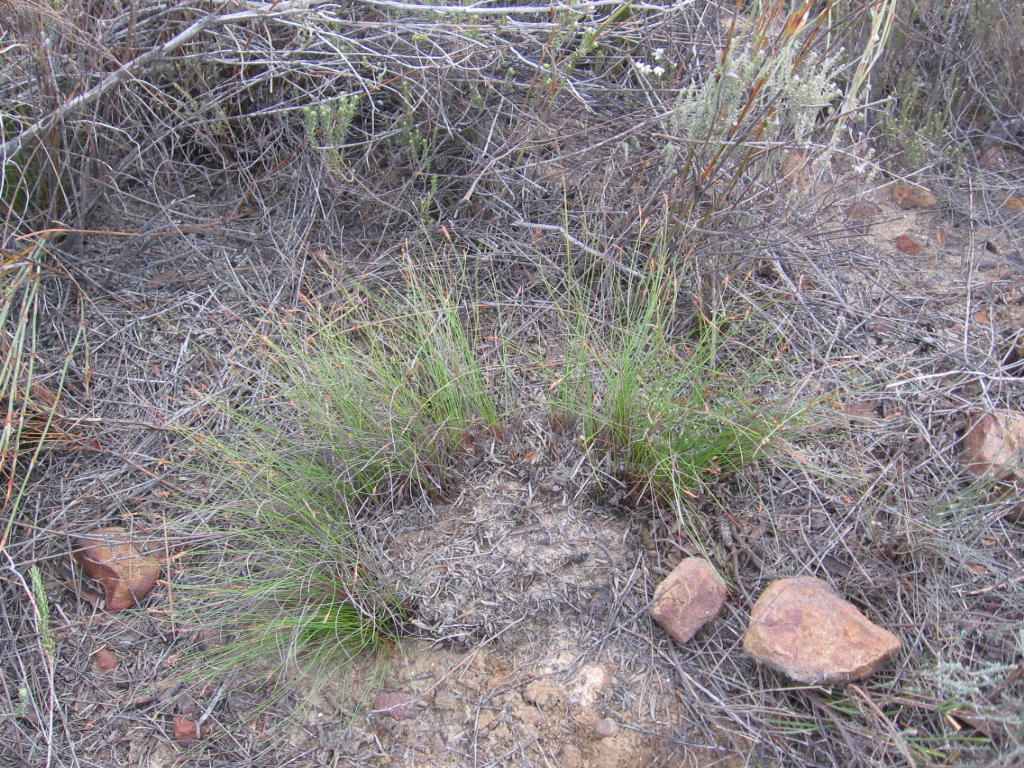
Growth form of Schoenus filiculmis

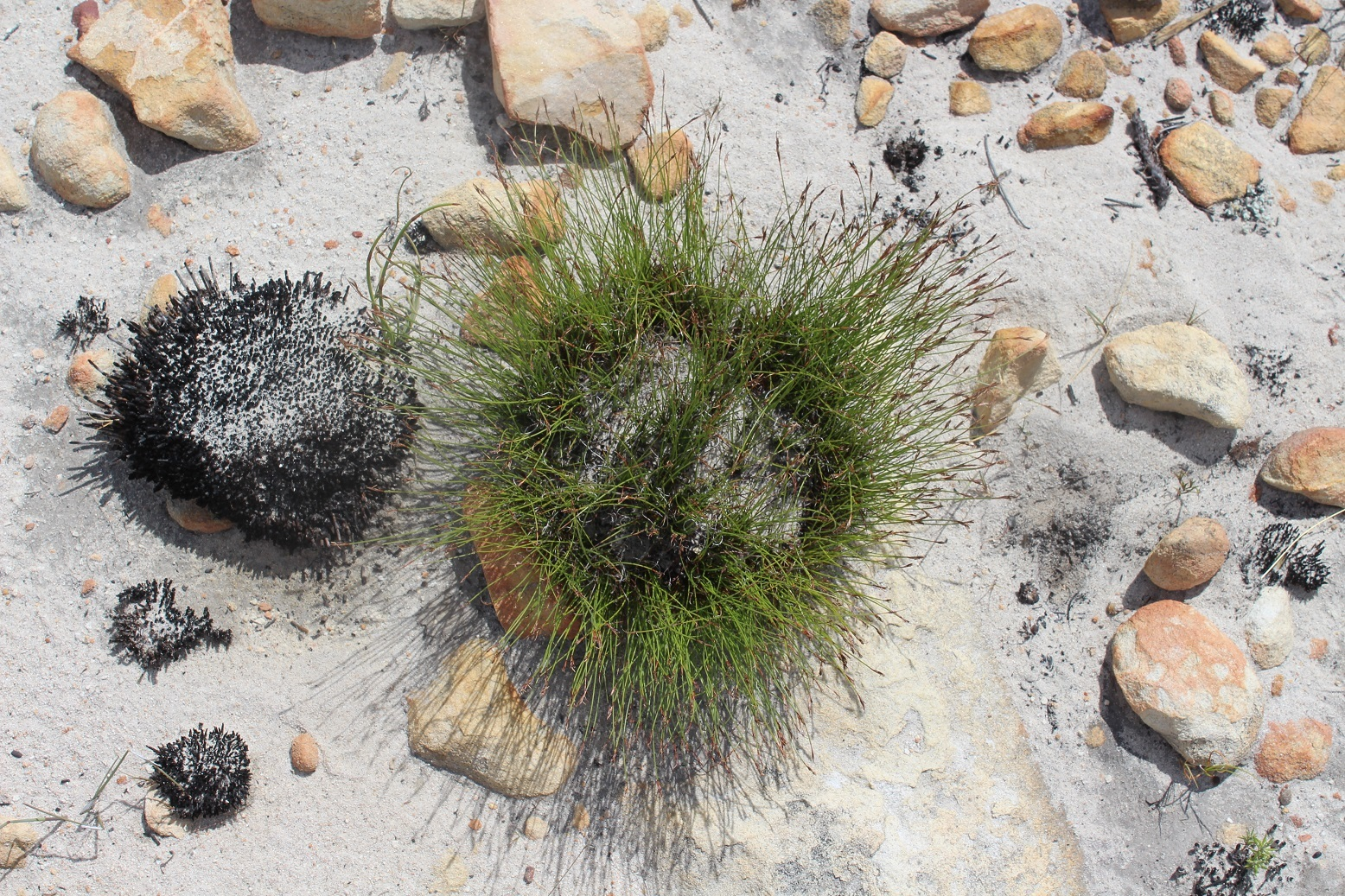
Growth form of Schoenus filiculmis
