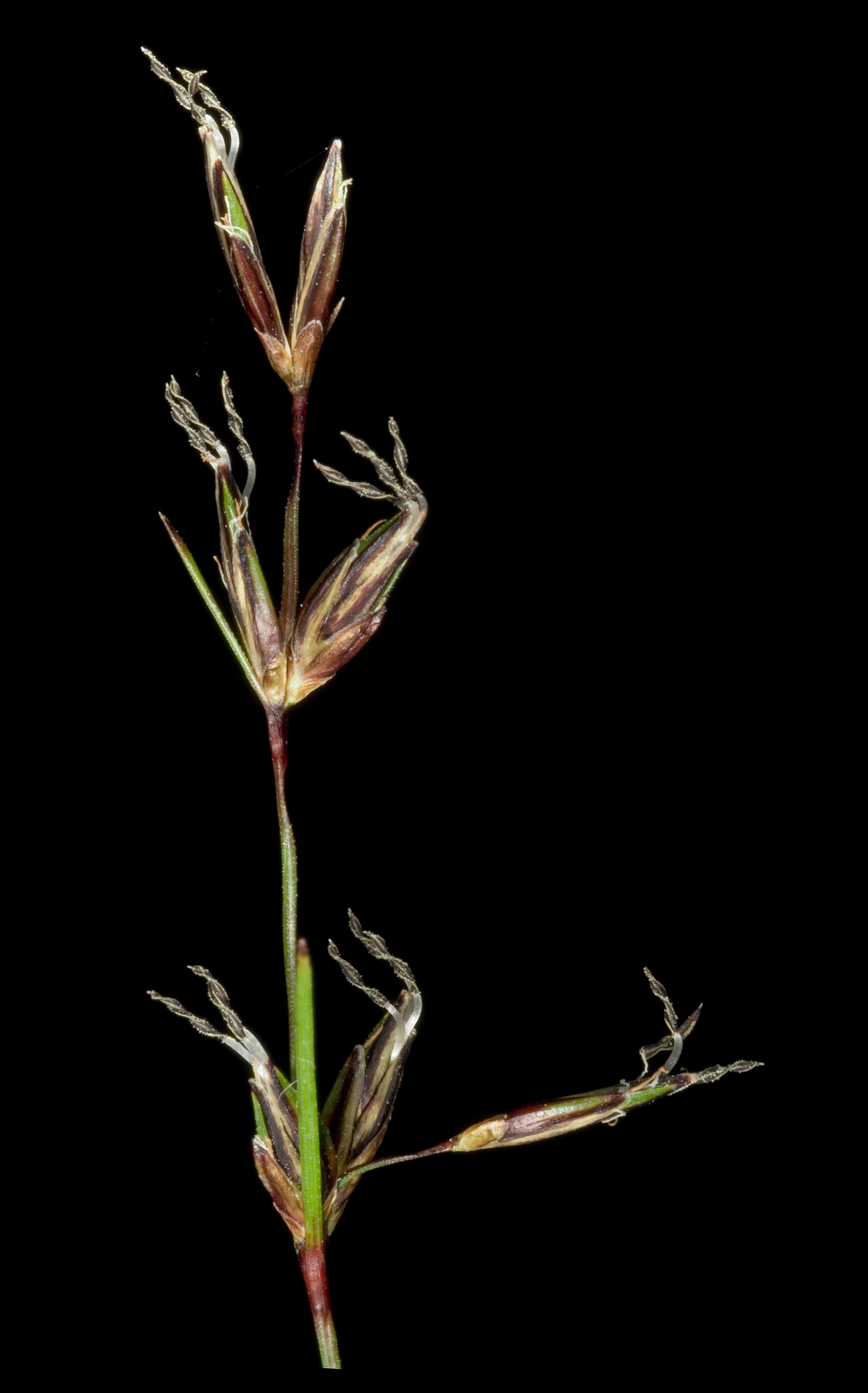

Scientific classification
- Kingdom: Plantae
- Clade: Tracheophytes
- Clade: Angiosperms
- Clade: Monocots
- Clade: Commelinids
- Order: Poales
- Family: Cyperaceae
- Genus: Schoenus
- Species: S. variicellae

Binomial name
- Schoenus variicellae Rye

= Schoenus variicellae =

Species of sedge

Schoenus variicellae is a species of sedge, first described in 1997 by Barbara Rye. It is native to Western Australia.

It is an annual sedge growing from 2 cm to 16 cm high in damp situations on clay or sandy clay and is found on granite outcrops. It flowers from August to November.
