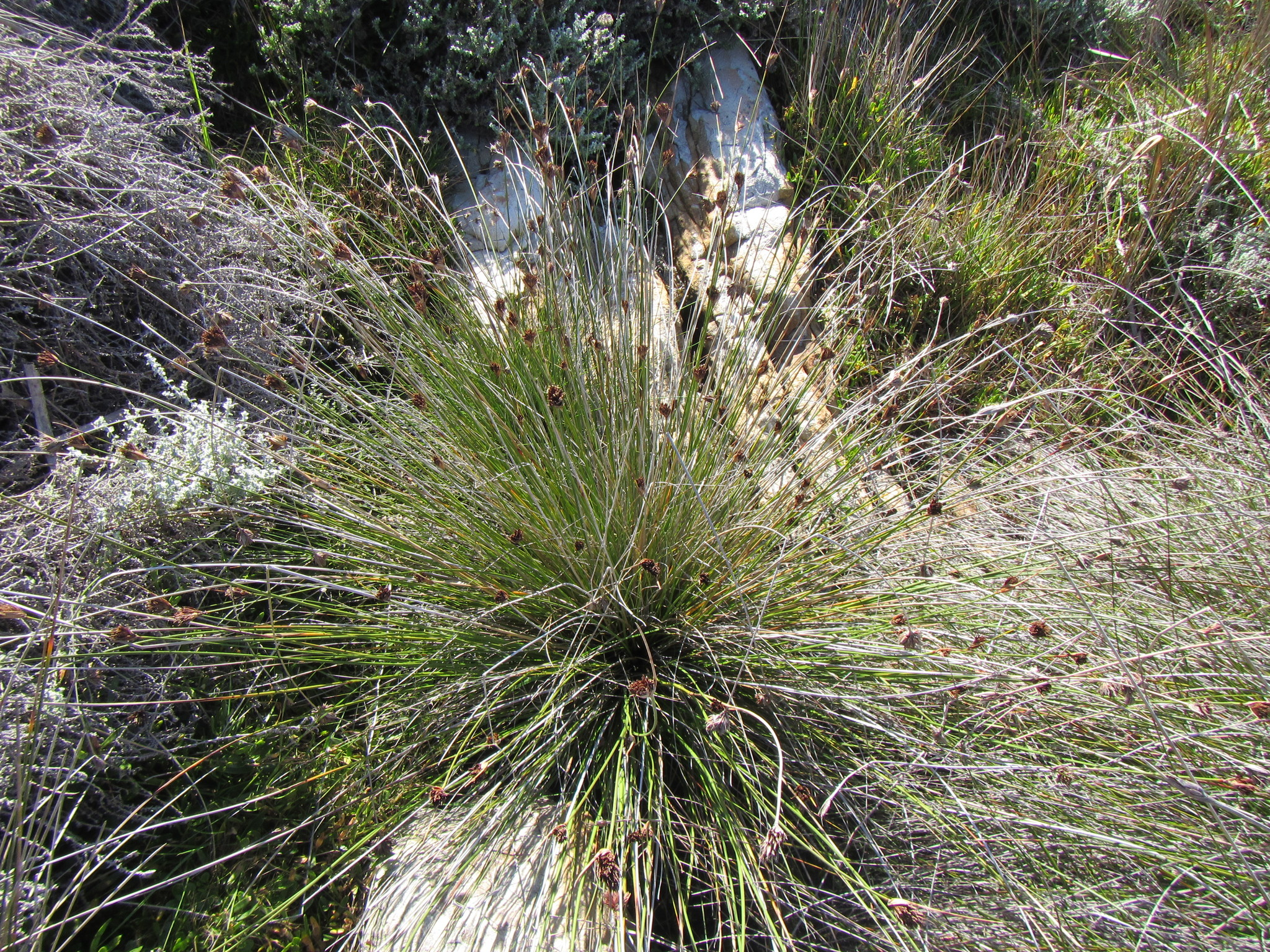
- Schoenus nigricans (Black bogrush) in South Africa. This is the most widespread of all Schoenus species.

Scientific classification
- Kingdom: Plantae
- Clade: Embryophytes
- Clade: Tracheophytes
- Clade: Spermatophytes
- Clade: Angiosperms
- Clade: Monocots
- Clade: Commelinids
- Order: Poales
- Family: Cyperaceae
- Tribe: Schoeneae
- Genus: Schoenus; L.
- Species richness of Schoenus mapped according to botanical regions

Synonyms
- Cyclocampe Steud.; Epischoenus C.B.Clarke; Gymnochaeta Steud.; Helothrix Nees; Isoschoenus Nees; Lepidospora (F.Muell.) F.Muell.; Lophocarpus Boeckeler; Melanoschoenos Ség.; Neolophocarpus E.G.Camus; Streblidia Link

= Schoenus (plant) =

Genus of grass-like plants

Schoenus is a predominately austral genus of sedges, commonly known as bogrushes, or veldrushes in South Africa. Species of this genus occur mainly in South Africa (some 44 species), Australia (some 70 species) and Southeast Asia. Others are found in scattered locations worldwide, from Europe (2 species) to Asia, North Africa (1 species) and the Americas. Three species occur in the peatlands of southern South America, including S. antarcticus which is found in Tierra del Fuego, where it forms a component of hyperhumid Magellanic moorland.

Taxonomic attention to the South African taxa, starting 2017, revealed a wealth of species. Twenty-four species were transferred from Tetraria and Epischoenus into Schoenus, and several new species were described. S. inconspicuus, discovered on the outskirts of Cape Town, consists of only a few specimens.

== Etymology ==
The Greek word schoinos means 'rush', 'reed' or 'coord'. Schoenus has also been used to represent ancient Egyptian, Greek and Roman units of length and area based on knotted cords. In addition, it was the name of several ancient Greek towns, which were located in Arcadia, Boeotia and Corinthia, as well as several individuals in Greek mythology.

== Description ==
Similar to other sedges (plants in family Cyperaceae), Schoenus are graminoid (grass-like) monocotyledonous flowering plants. Most species of Schoenus usually grow in clumps, but a few species are more spreading in growth form. The flowering stems (culms) of Schoenus are usually round (terete), but there are some species with angular (e.g. Schoenus quadrangularis) or flat (e.g. Schoenus complanatus) culms. Leaves of Schoenus are serrate, basal and usually well-developed, but there are some species with leaves reduced to a sheath (e.g. Schoenus gracillimus). Several species are hairy (e.g. Schoenus neovillosus), but in this genus it is not common to have hairs.

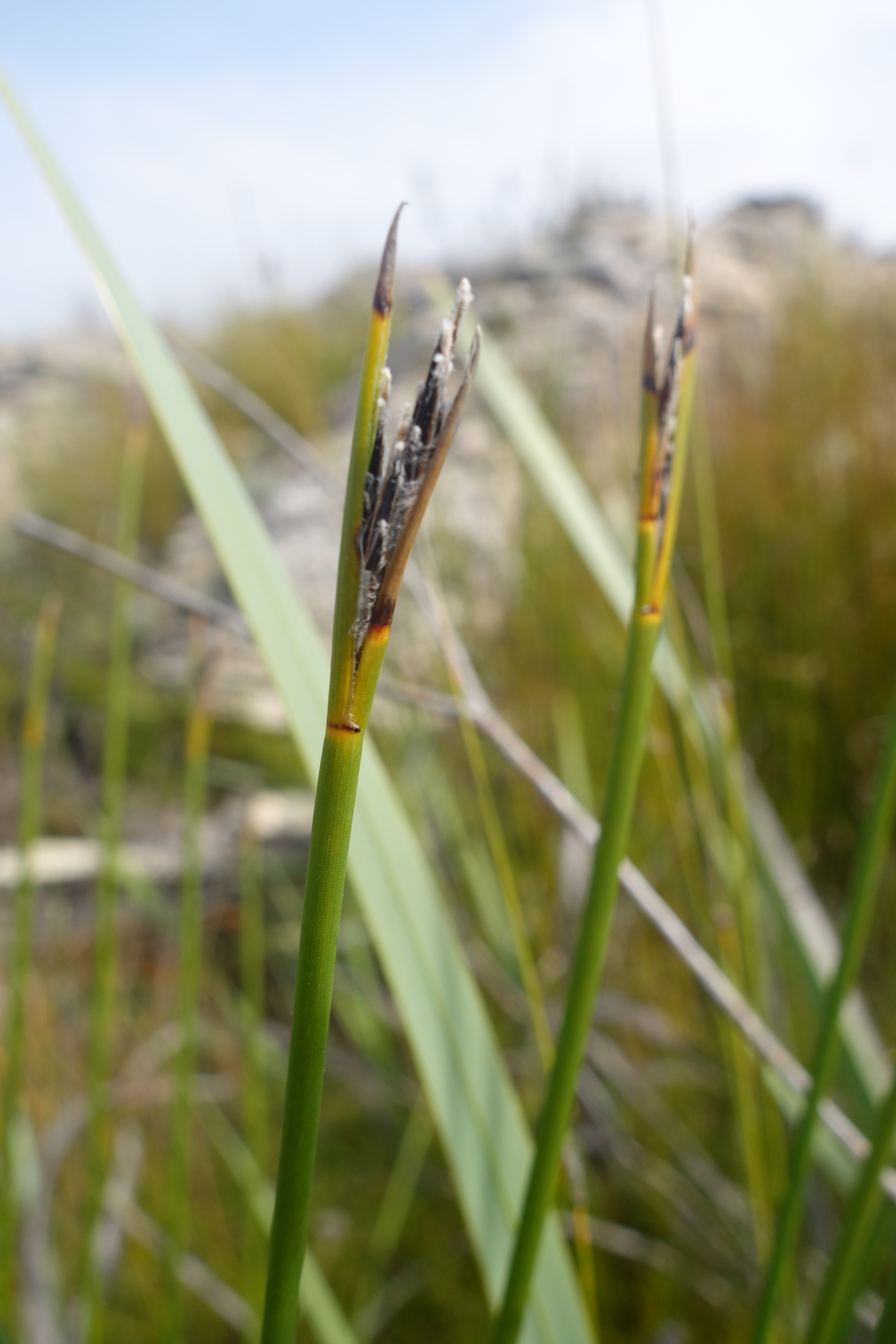
Round flowering stems of Schoenus lucidus

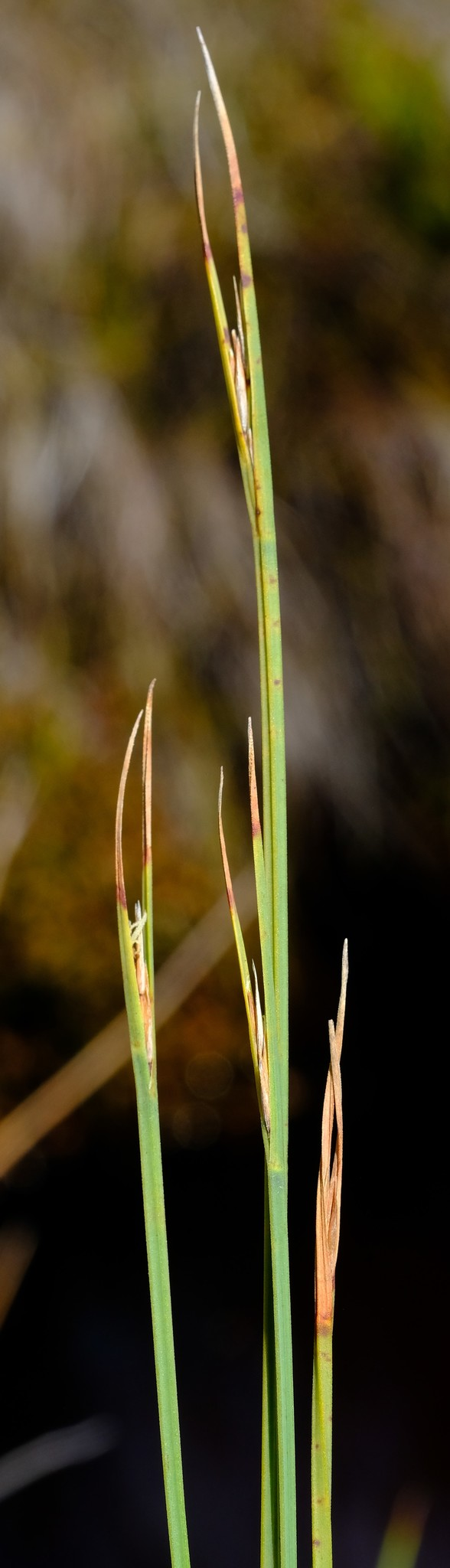
Angled flowering stems

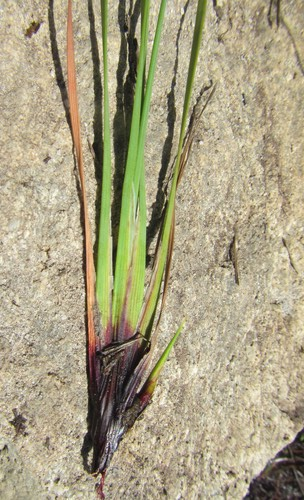
Flat flowering stems of Schoenus complanatus

== Schoenus species ==
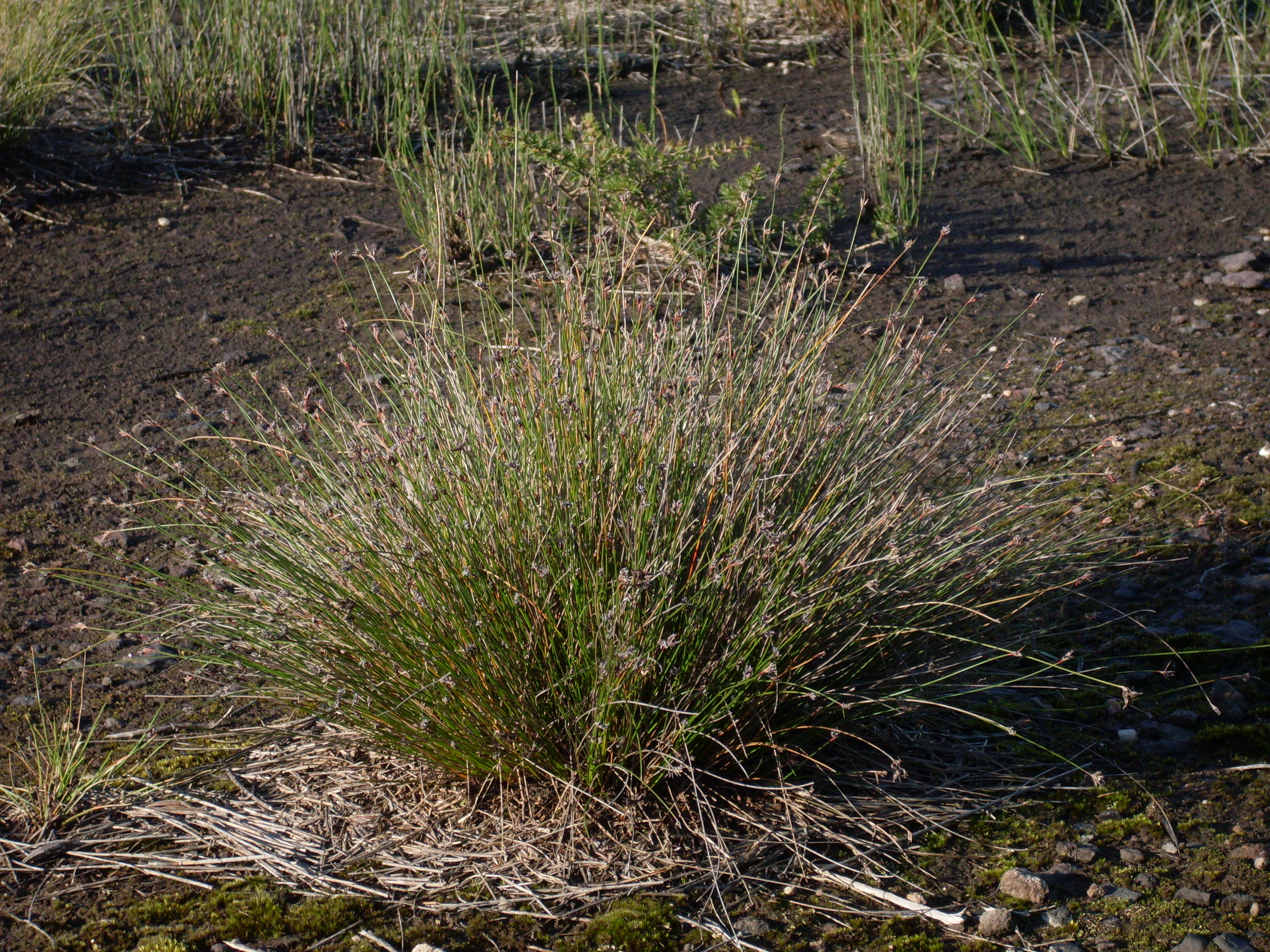
Schoenus imberbis

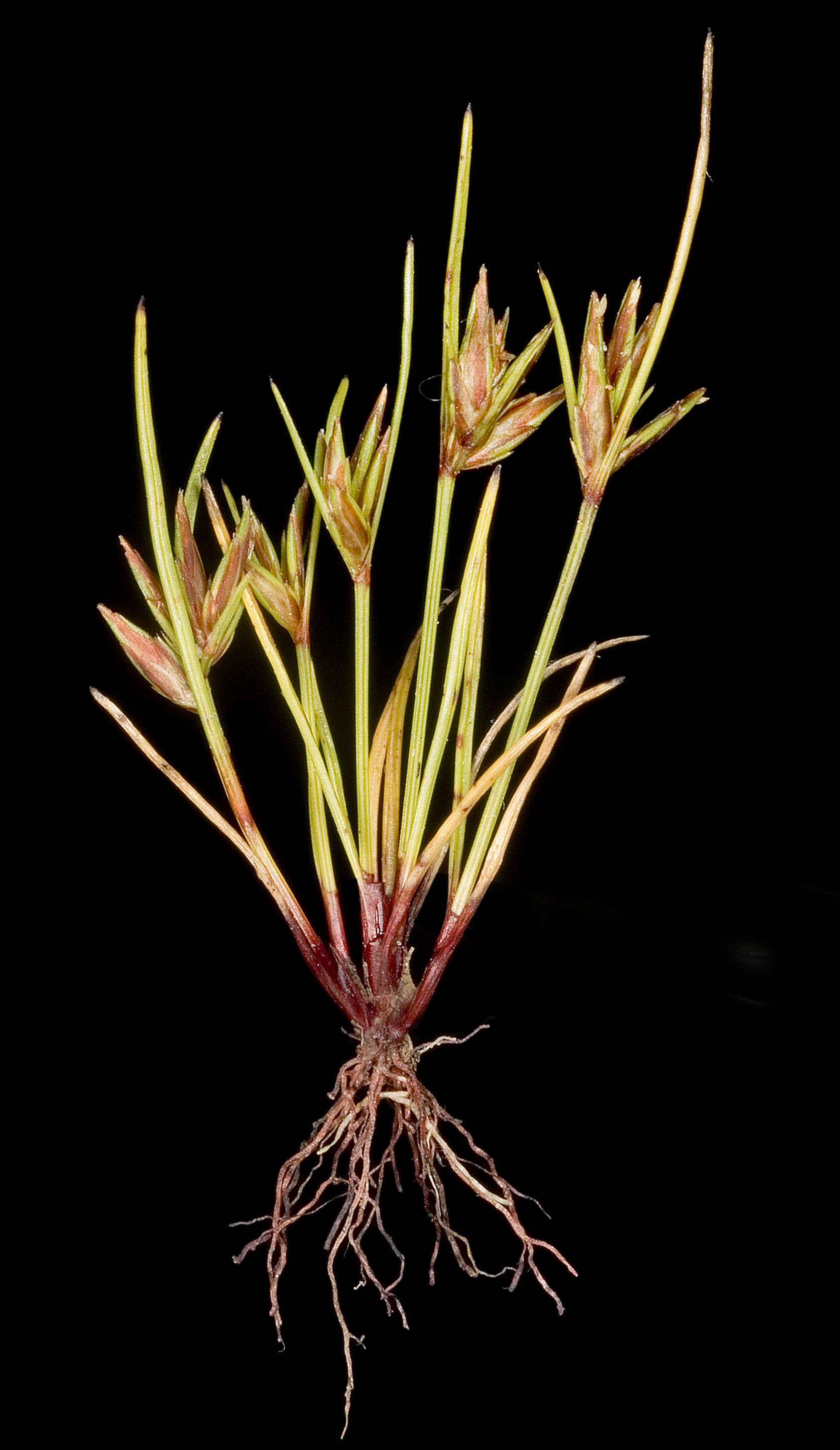
Schoenus nanus

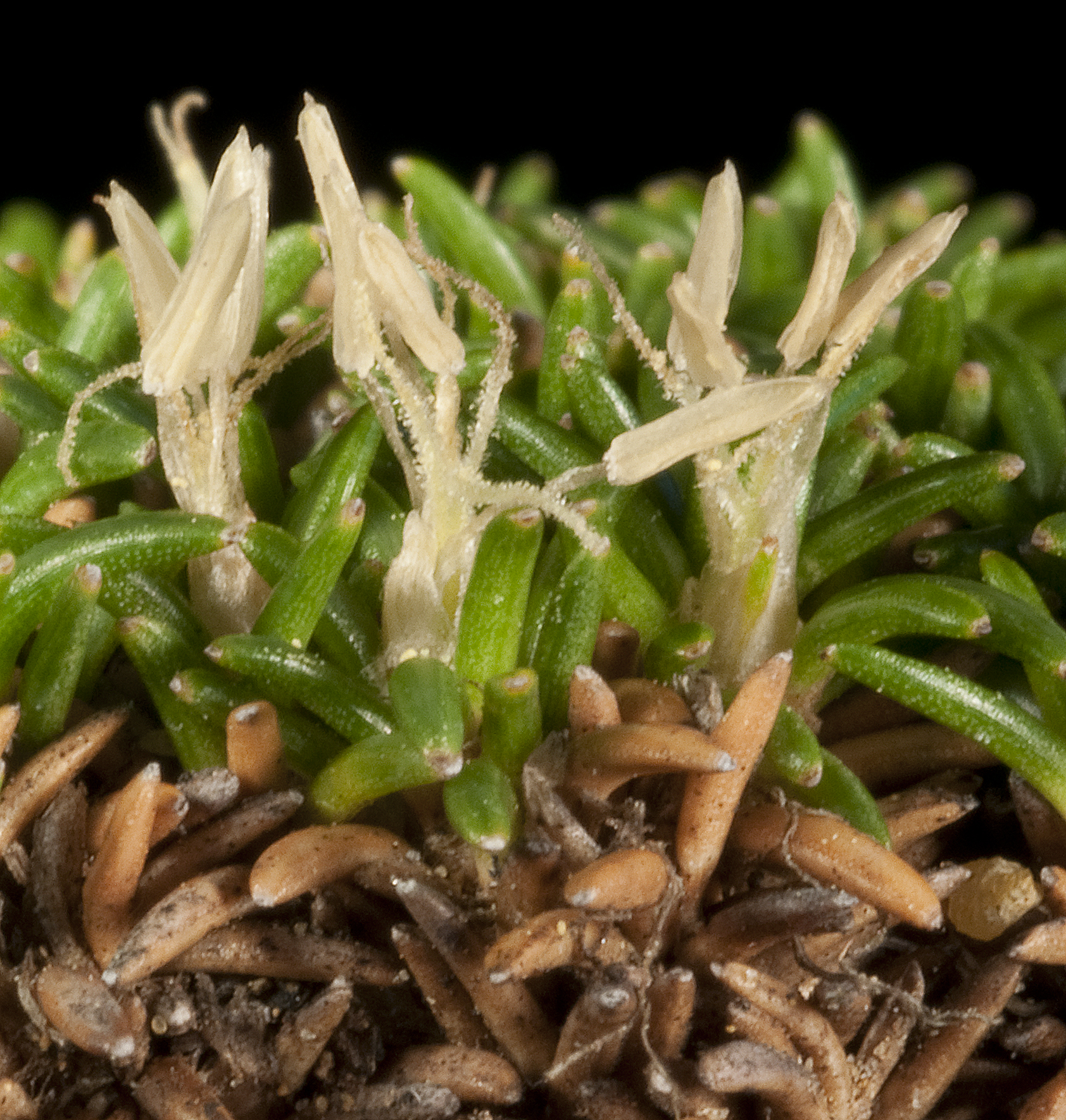
Schoenus calcatus

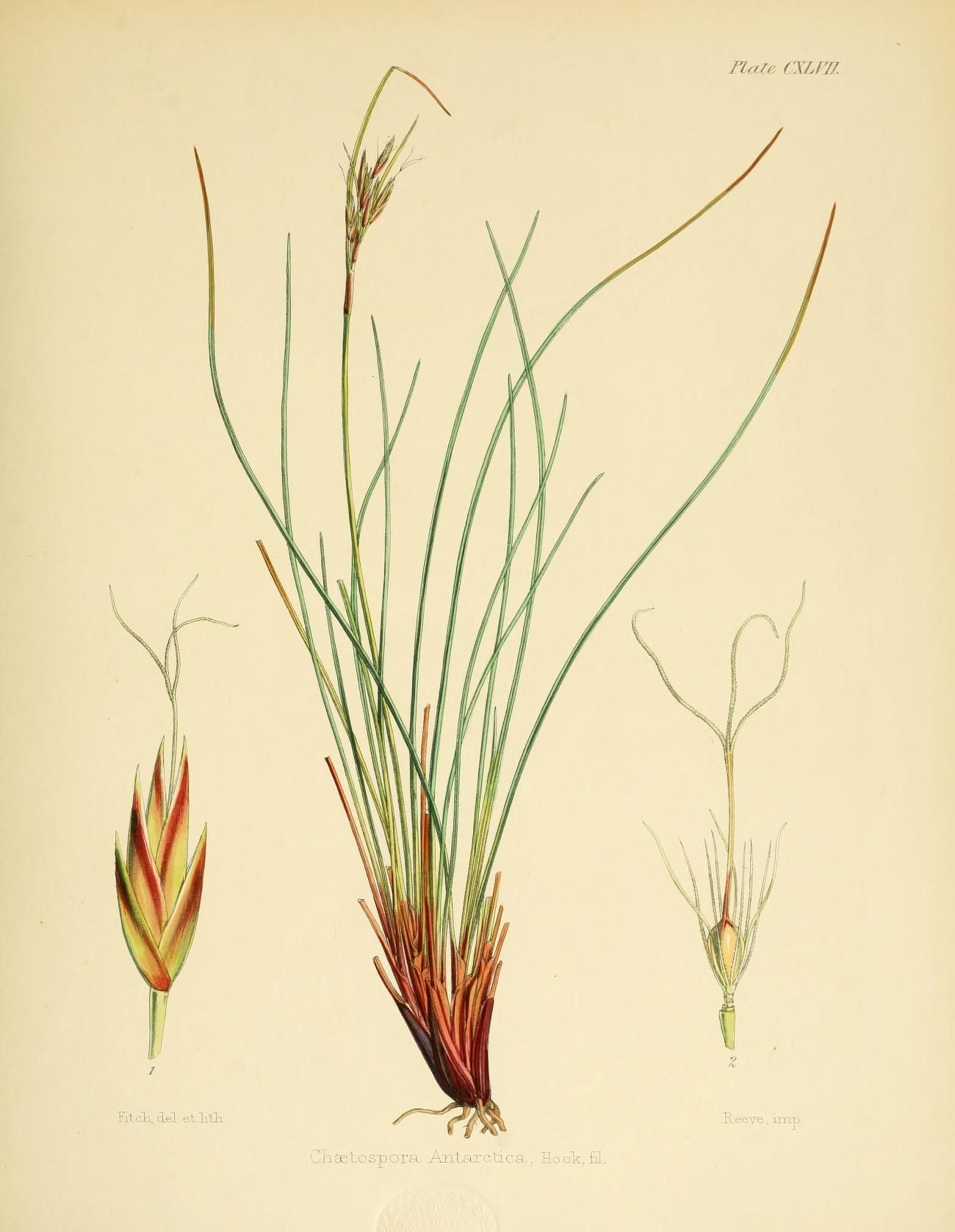
Illustration of S. antarcticus, native to Tierra del Fuego

As of December 2025, the Plants of the World Online database indicates there are 155 species of Schoenus (including hybrids).

Bogrushes

- Schoenus absconditus Kük. ― Hidden bogrush
- Schoenus achaetus (T.Koyama) T.Koyama
- Schoenus acuminatus R.Br.
- Schoenus andinus (Phil.) H.Pfeiff.
- Schoenus andrewsii W.Fitzg.
- Schoenus antarcticus (Hook.f.) Dusén
- Schoenus apogon Roem. & Schult. ― Smooth bogrush
- Schoenus armeria (Nees) Boeckeler
- Schoenus asperocarpus F.Muell.
- Schoenus badius Rye
- Schoenus benthamii F.Muell.
- Schoenus bifidus (Nees) Boeckeler
- Schoenus biglumis Kük.
- Schoenus breviculmis Benth. ― Matted bogrush
- Schoenus brevifolius R.Br. ― Zig-zag bogrush
- Schoenus brevisetis (R.Br.) Roem. & Schult.
- Schoenus caespititius W.Fitzg.
- Schoenus calcatus K.L.Wilson
- Schoenus calostachyus (R.Br.) Roem. & Schult.
- Schoenus calyptratus Kük. ― Alpine bogrush
- Schoenus capillifolius D.A.Cooke
- Schoenus carsei Cheeseman
- Schoenus centralis Latz
- Schoenus clandestinus S.T.Blake
- Schoenus coultasii Hislop
- Schoenus cruentus (Nees) Benth.
- Schoenus curvulus F.Muell.
- Schoenus cygneus (Nees) Nees
- Schoenus deformis (R.Br.) Roem. & Schult.
- Schoenus delicatulus (Fernald) J.Kern
- Schoenus discifer Tate
- Schoenus efoliatus F.Muell.
- Schoenus elegans S.T.Blake
- Schoenus ericetorum R.Br. ― Heath bogrush
- Schoenus evansianus K.L.Wilson
- Schoenus falcatus R.Br. ― Sickle bog-rush
- Schoenus ferrugineus L. ― Brown bog-rush, endemic to Europe
- Schoenus fluitans Hook.f. ― Floating veldrush
- Schoenus globifer Nees
- Schoenus grammatophyllus F.Muell.
- Schoenus griffinianus K.L.Wilson
- Schoenus hexandrus F.Muell. & Tate
- Schoenus humilis Benth.
- Schoenus imberbis R.Br. ― Beardless bogrush
- Schoenus indutus Benth.
- Schoenus insolitus K.L.Wilson
- Schoenus kennyi (F.M.Bailey) S.T.Blake ― Kenny's bog-rush
- Schoenus laevigatus W.Fitzg.
- Schoenus laevinux (Kük.) Ohwi
- Schoenus lanatus Labill.
- Schoenus latelaminatus Kük. ― Medusa bogrush
- Schoenus latitans S.T.Blake
- Schoenus lepidosperma (F.Muell.) K.L.Wilson
- Schoenus loliaceus Kük.
- Schoenus longibracteatus Kük.
- Schoenus lymansmithii M.T.Strong
- Schoenus maschalinus Roem. & Schult. ― Dwarf bogrush
- Schoenus melanostachys R.Br. ― Black bogrush
- Schoenus minutulus F.Muell.
- Schoenus moorei Benth.
- Schoenus multiglumis Benth.
- Schoenus nanus (Nees) Benth. ― Tiny bogrush
- Schoenus natans (F.Muell.) Benth.
- Schoenus neocaledonicus C.B.Clarke
- Schoenus nigricans L. ― Black sedge, cosmopolitan range
- Schoenus nitens (R.Br.) Roem. & Schult. ― Shiny bogrush
- Schoenus nudifructus C.Chen
- Schoenus obtusifolius (Nees) Boeckeler
- Schoenus odontocarpus F.Muell.
- Schoenus ornithopodioides (Kük.) S.T.Blake ― Bird's foot bogrush
- Schoenus pauciflorus (Hook.f.) Hook.f. ― Sedge tussock
- Schoenus pedicellatus (R.Br.) Roem. & Schult.
- Schoenus pennisetis S.T.Blake
- Schoenus pleiostemoneus F.Muell.
- Schoenus plumosus Rye
- Schoenus punctatus R.Br.
- Schoenus pygmaeus S.T.Blake ― Pigmy bogrush
- Schoenus racemosus J.M.Black ― Branched bogrush
- Schoenus rhynchosporoides (Steud.) Kük.
- Schoenus rigens S.T.Blake
- Schoenus rivularis J.Raynal ex K.L.Wilson
- Schoenus rodwayanus W.Fitzg.
- Schoenus rupicola P.M.Musili & J.J.Bruhl
- Schoenus scabripes Benth.
- Schoenus sculptus (Nees) Boeckeler ― Gimlet foot bogrush
- Schoenus sesquispicula C.B.Clarke
- Schoenus setiformis S.T.Blake
- Schoenus sinensis Hand.-Mazz.
- Schoenus smitinandii T.Koyama
- Schoenus sparteus R.Br. ― Broom bogrush
- Schoenus subaphyllus Kük. ― Desert bogrush
- Schoenus subbarbatus Kük.
- Schoenus subfascicularis Kük.
- Schoenus subflavus Kük.
- Schoenus sublateralis (Steud.) C.B.Clarke
- Schoenus sublaxus Kük.
- Schoenus submicrostachyus Kük.
- Schoenus tendo (Hook.f.) Hook.f.
- Schoenus tenellus Benth.
- Schoenus tenuissimus Benth.
- Schoenus tesquorum J.M.Black
- Schoenus thedae M.D.Barrett & R.L.Barrett
- Schoenus trachycarpus F.Muell.
- Schoenus unispiculatus F.Muell. ex Benth.
- Schoenus vaginatus Benth.
- Schoenus variicellae Rye
- Schoenus villosus R.Br. ― Hairy bogrush
- Schoenus yarrabensis Domin

== Southern African Schoenus ==
The genus Schoenus includes 44 species from the southern Africa Schoenus clade, which are divided into three main groups.

Veldrushes

Schoenus cuspidatus group

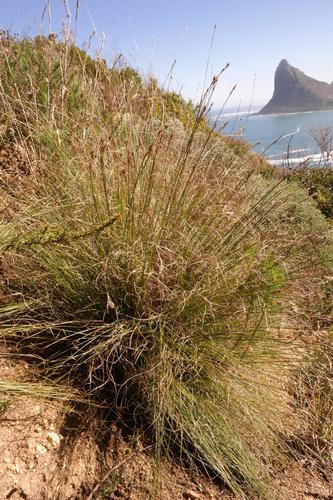
Schoenus graminifolius

- Schoenus auritus (Nees) T.L.Elliott & Muasya ― Fleshy veldrush
- Schoenus australis T.L.Elliott & Muasya ― Southern veldrush
- Schoenus bolusii (C.B.Clarke) T.L.Elliott & Muasya ― Spotted veldrush
- Schoenus brunnescens ― Brown veldrush
- Schoenus calceolus T.L.Elliott & Muasya ― Limestone veldrush
- Schoenus compactus (Levyns) T.L.Elliott & Muasya ― Congested veldrush
- Schoenus crassiculmis (Levyns) T.L.Elliott & Muasya ― Succulent veldrush
- Schoenus crassus (Levyns) T.L.Elliott & Muasya ― Robust veldrush
- Schoenus cuspidatus Rottb. ― Sharp veldrush
- Schoenus exilis (Levyns) T.L.Elliott & Muasya ― Small veldrush
- Schoenus galpinii (Schönland & Turrill) T.L.Elliott & Muasya ― Mountain veldrush
- Schoenus graciliculmis T.L.Elliott & Muasya ― Delicate veldrush
- Schoenus graminifolius (Levyns) T.L.Elliott & Muasya ― Grassleaf veldrush
- Schoenus inconspicuus ― Hidden veldrush
- Schoenus ligulatus Kuntze ― Strap veldrush
- Schoenus limosus T.L.Elliott & Muasya ― Muddy veldrush
- Schoenus loreus (Nees) Kuntze ― Flatleaf veldrush
- Schoenus prophyllus T.L.Elliott & Muasya ― Bract veldrush
- Schoenus purpurascens T.L.Elliott & Muasya ― Purple veldrush
- Schoenus quartziticus T.L.Elliott & Muasya ― Quartz veldrush
- Schoenus riparius T.L.Elliott & Muasya ― River veldrush
- Schoenus submarginalis T.L.Elliott & Muasya ― Marginal veldrush

Epischoenus group

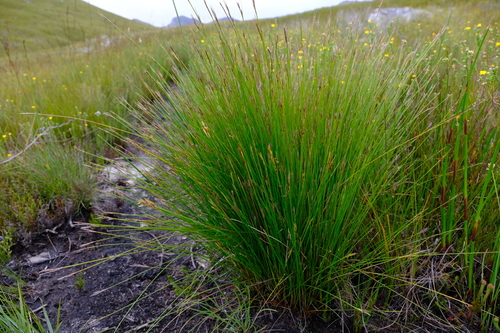
Schoenus selinae

- Schoenus adnatus (Levyns) T.L.Elliott & Muasya ― Flat veldrush
- Schoenus complanatus (Levyns) T.L.Elliott & Muasya ― Flat veldrush
- Schoenus crinitus T.L.Elliott & Muasya ― Downy veldrush
- Schoenus dregeanus (Boeckeler) Kuntze ― Slim veldrush
- Schoenus gracillimus T.L.Elliott & Muasya ― Slender veldrush
- Schoenus lucidus (C.B.Clarke) T.L.Elliott & Muasya ― Bright veldrush
- Schoenus neovillosus T.L.Elliott & Muasya ― Hairy veldrush
- Schoenus quadrangularis Boeckeler ― Square veldrush
- Schoenus rigidus T.L.Elliott & Muasya ― Ridge veldrush
- Schoenus schonlandii (Turrill) T.L.Elliott & Muasya ― Eastern veldrush
- Schoenus selinae T.L.Elliott, Muthaphuli & Muasya ― Auricle veldrush

Schoenus compar - Schoenus pictus group

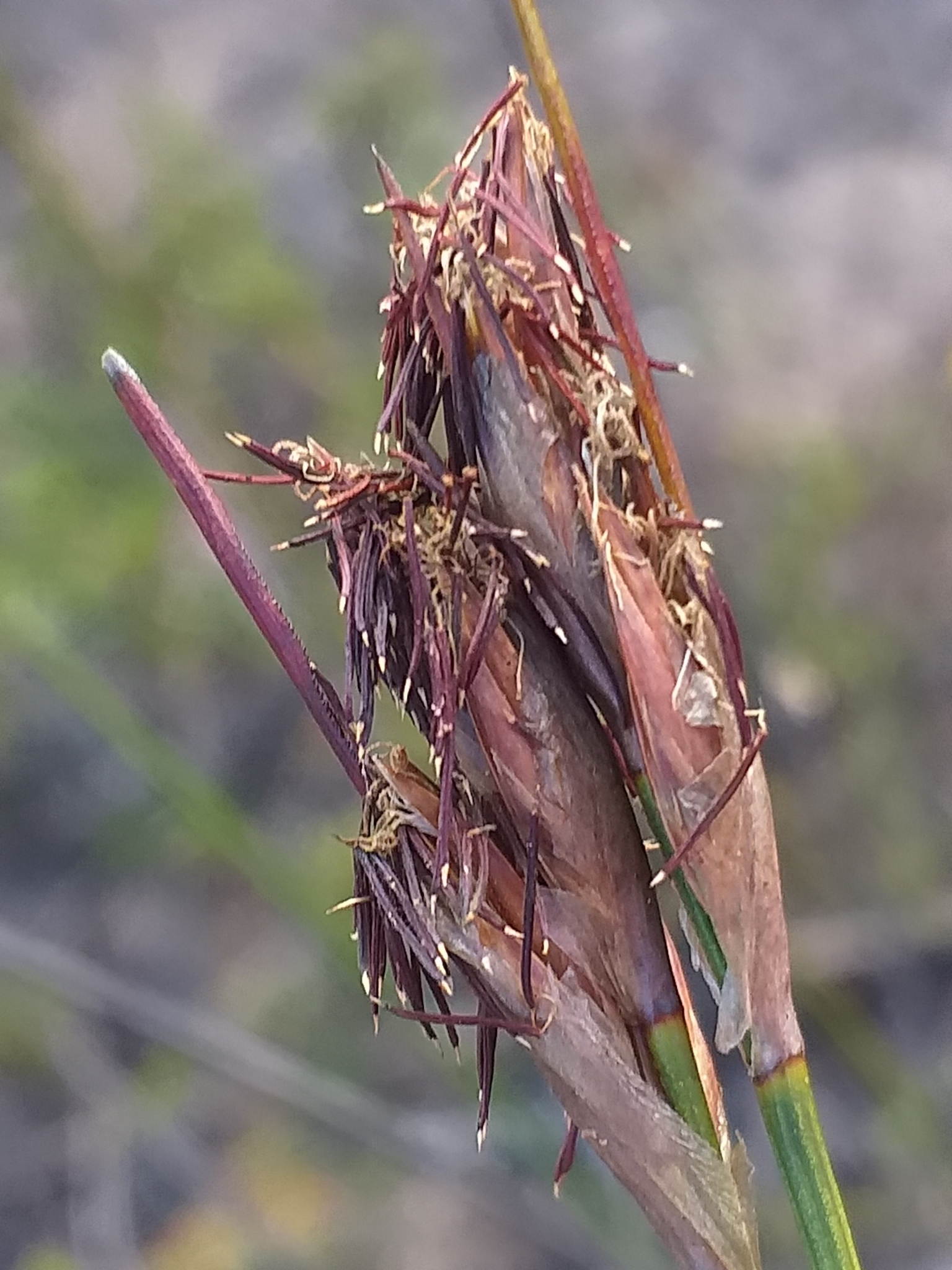
Flowering head of Schoenus megacarpus

- Schoenus albovaginatus T.L.Elliott & Muasya ― Whitesheath veldrush
- Schoenus arenicola T.L.Elliott & Muasya ― Sand veldrush
- Schoenus aureus T.L.Elliott & Muasya ― Gold veldrush
- Schoenus compar L. ― Ivory veldrush
- Schoenus comparoides T.L.Elliott & Muasya ― Foothill veldrush
- Schoenus megacarpus T.L.Elliott & Muasya ― Bignut veldrush
- Schoenus pictus (Boeckeler) Kuntze ― Yellow veldrush
- Schoenus pseudoloreus (Kük.) T.L.Elliott & Muasya ― Eared veldrush
- Schoenus triticoides T.L.Elliott & Muasya ― Wheat veldrush

Unplaced species

- Schoenus bracteosus (C.B.Clarke) T.L.Elliott & Muasya ― Bristleglume veldrush
- Schoenus filiculmis T.L.Elliott & Muasya ― Wiry veldrush
