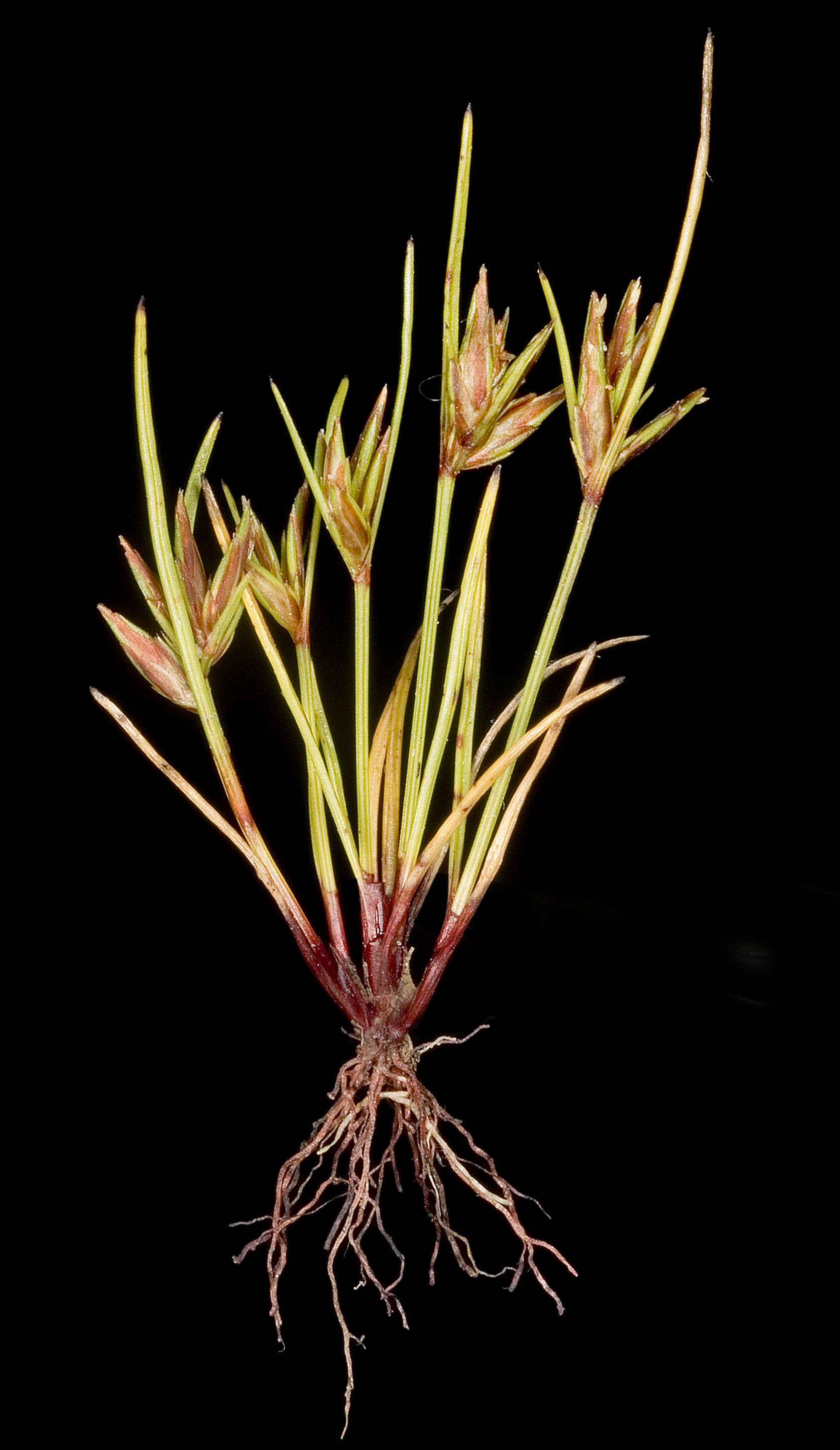

Scientific classification
- Kingdom: Plantae
- Clade: Embryophytes
- Clade: Tracheophytes
- Clade: Spermatophytes
- Clade: Angiosperms
- Clade: Monocots
- Clade: Commelinids
- Order: Poales
- Family: Cyperaceae
- Genus: Schoenus
- Species: S. nanus

Binomial name
- Schoenus nanus (Nees ex Lehm.) Benth.

Synonyms
- Chaetospora nana Nees ex Lehm.

= Schoenus nanus =

Species of sedge

Schoenus nanus is a species of sedge in the family Cyperaceae. It is endemic to Australia, and found in Western Australia, South Australia and Victoria. It was first described in 1844 by Christian Gottfried Daniel Nees von Esenbeck as Chaetospora nana, but in 1878 was transferred by George Bentham to the genus, Schoenus.

In Victoria, this species is listed as "endangered".

== Description ==
Bentham describes the plant as follows:

Dwarf and densely tufted but perhaps annual. Stems ¾ to 1½ in. high. Leaves radical, filiform, shorter than the stem. Spikelets terminal, erect, 2 to 4 together, sessile or very shortly pedicellate between 2 involucral bracts, 1 often longer than the inflorescence. Spikelets narrow-lanceolate, flattened, 3 to 3½ lines long, with 4 to 5 flowers. Outer glumes gradually shorter, but usually only the lowest one empty. Hypogynous bristles 6, shorter than the nut or 1 or 2 longer, very shortly ciliate, not plumose. Stamens 3. Nut obovoid-globular, the ribs scarcely prominent, obtuse, tubercular-rugose.

A more recent description is given by Karen Wilson in 1994.

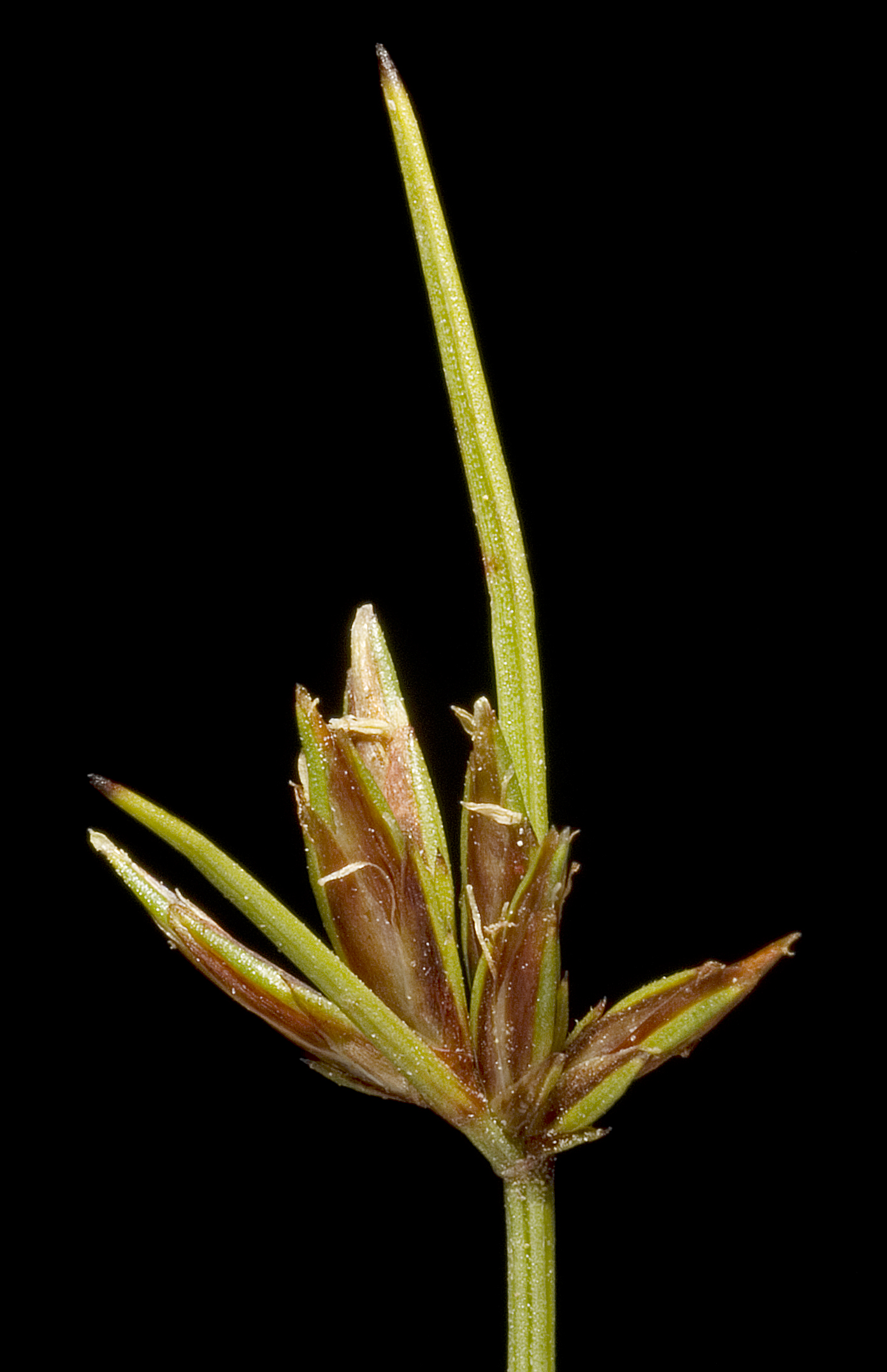
Schoenus nanus
