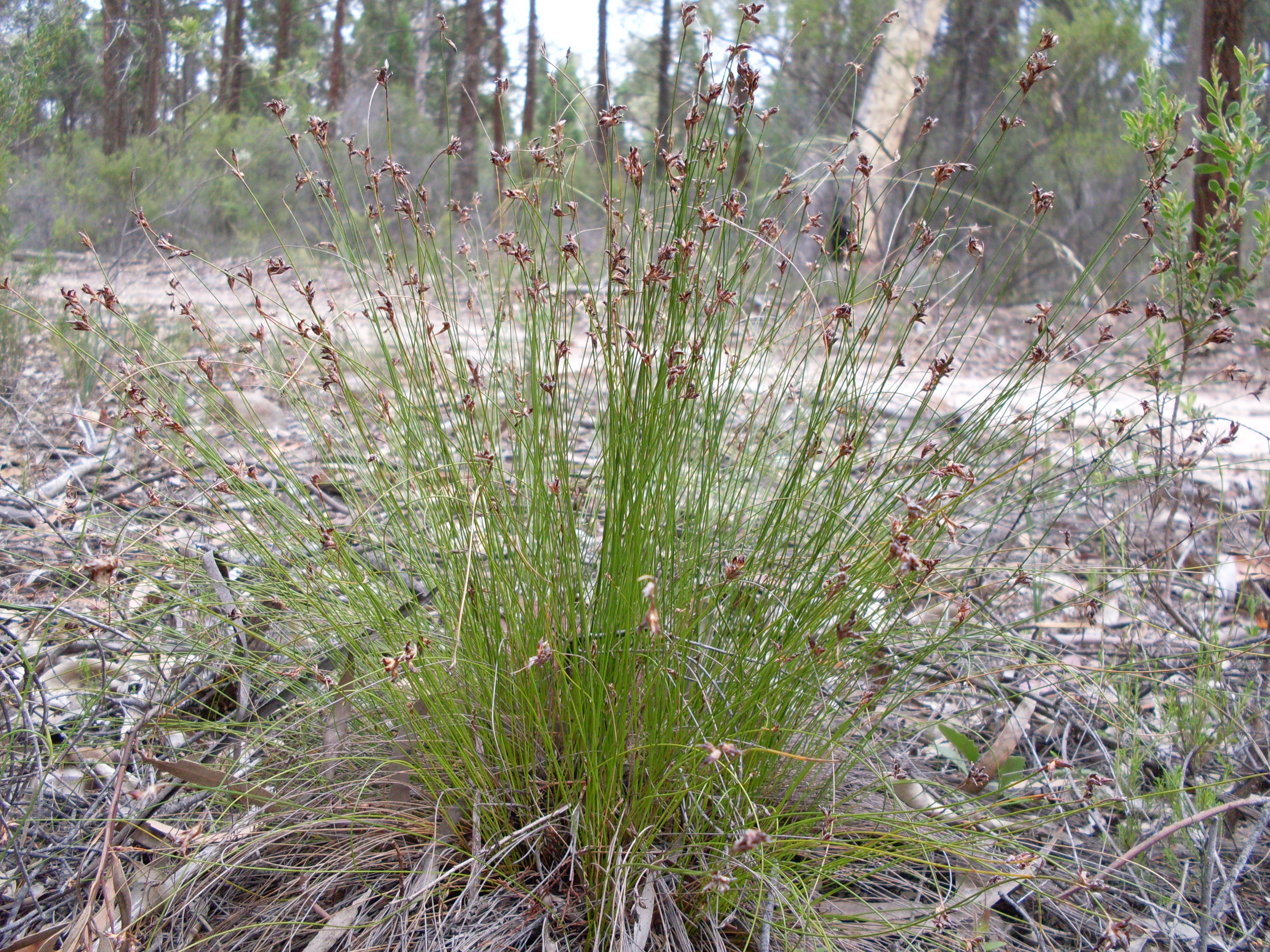
- Munghorn Gap Nature Reserve, Australia

Scientific classification
- Kingdom: Plantae
- Clade: Tracheophytes
- Clade: Angiosperms
- Clade: Monocots
- Clade: Commelinids
- Order: Poales
- Family: Cyperaceae
- Genus: Schoenus
- Species: S. ericetorum

Binomial name
- Schoenus ericetorum R.Br.

= Schoenus ericetorum =

heath bog-rush

Species of grass-like plant

Schoenus ericetorum, known as heath bog-rush, is a species of sedge native to eastern Australia. A tufted perennial grass-like plant growing to 40 cm tall. Often seen in heath and dry eucalyptus forest on sandy soils. This is one of the many plants first published by Robert Brown with the type known as "(J.) v.v." It appears in his Prodromus Florae Novae Hollandiae et Insulae Van Diemen in 1810.
