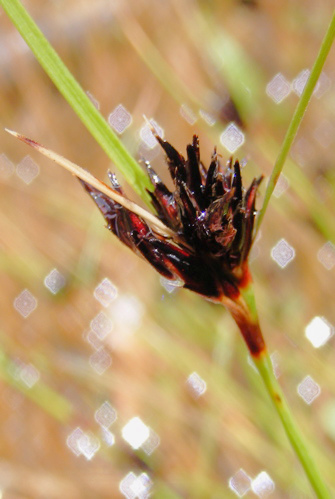

Scientific classification
- Kingdom: Plantae
- Clade: Tracheophytes
- Clade: Angiosperms
- Clade: Monocots
- Clade: Commelinids
- Order: Poales
- Family: Cyperaceae
- Genus: Schoenus
- Species: S. apogon

Binomial name
- Schoenus apogon Roem. & Schult.

Synonyms
- Schoenus apogon var. reductus Kuek.; Schoenus apogon var. laxiflorus (Steud.) C.B.Clarke & Cheeseman; Schoenus apogon var. apogon Roem. & Schult.

= Schoenus apogon =

Common bog-rush

Species of grass-like plant

Schoenus apogon, known as common bog-rush, is a species of sedge native to eastern Australia, New Zealand and Japan. A tufted annual grass-like plant growing to 55 cm tall. Often seen in seasonally wet habitats. A species of variable form, which may include more than one taxon. The specific epithet apogon is derived from Greek, meaning "no beard".
