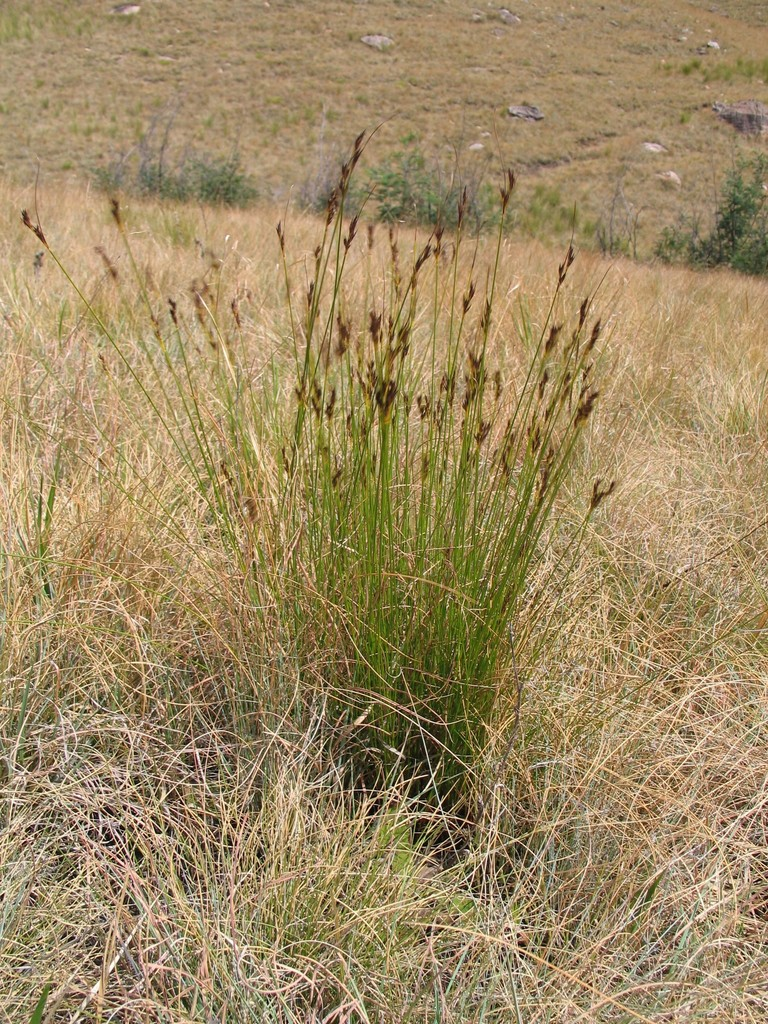
- Mountain veldrush

Scientific classification
- Kingdom: Plantae
- Clade: Tracheophytes
- Clade: Angiosperms
- Clade: Monocots
- Clade: Commelinids
- Order: Poales
- Family: Cyperaceae
- Genus: Schoenus
- Species: S. galpinii

Binomial name
- Schoenus galpinii (Schønland & Turrill) T.L.Elliott & Muasya
- Documented collection localities in South Africa

Synonyms
- Tetraria galpinii Schønland & Turrill

= Schoenus galpinii =

Species of grass-like plant

Schoenus galpinii is a species of sedge endemic to eastern southern Africa.

== Description ==
The main distinguishing morphological character of S. galpinii is that its primary inflorescence bracts, as well as prophyll and glume mucros are less-developed (often shorter or lacking) compared to other closely related southern African Schoenus species.

The distribution of S. galpinii differs from most other species in the Schoenus cuspidatus and allies group, except Schoenus graciliculmis and Schoenus limosus. Schoenus galpinii has cuspidate spikelets compared to the aristate spikelets of the other two species.

The species that morphologically most resembles S. galpinii is S. cuspidatus, which has more prominent inflorescence bracts, prophyll mucros and glume mucros compared to S. galpinii. The more prominent bracts and mucros of S. cuspidatus make it appear more 'bearded' compared to S. galpinii.

Similar to other sedges, plants in this group are very difficult to identify. It appears that part of this problem is caused by the tendency of the southern African Schoenus to form hybrids with each other. It is not known whether Schoenus galpinii forms hybrids with other southern African Schoenus species.

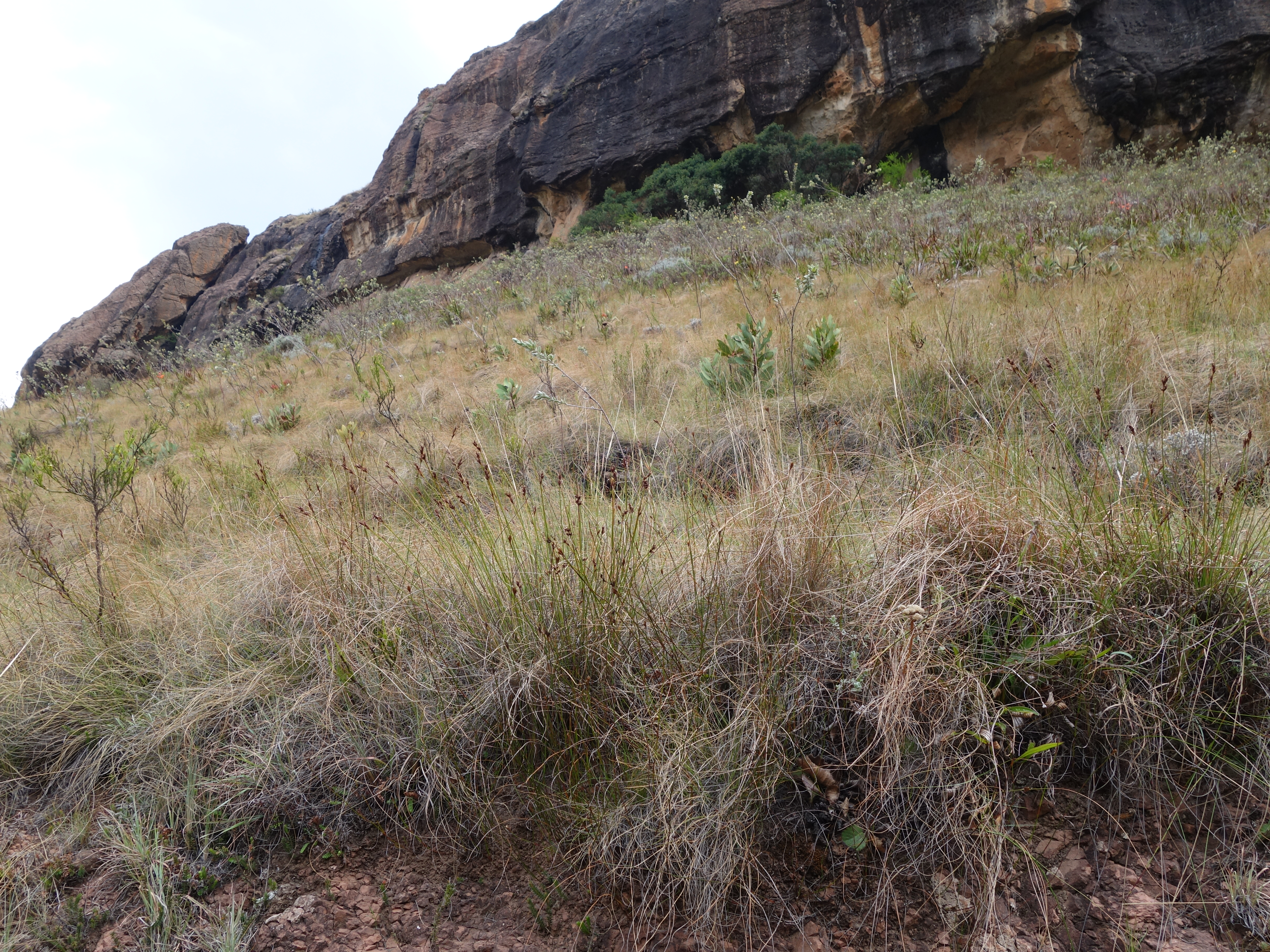
Habitat of S. galpinii

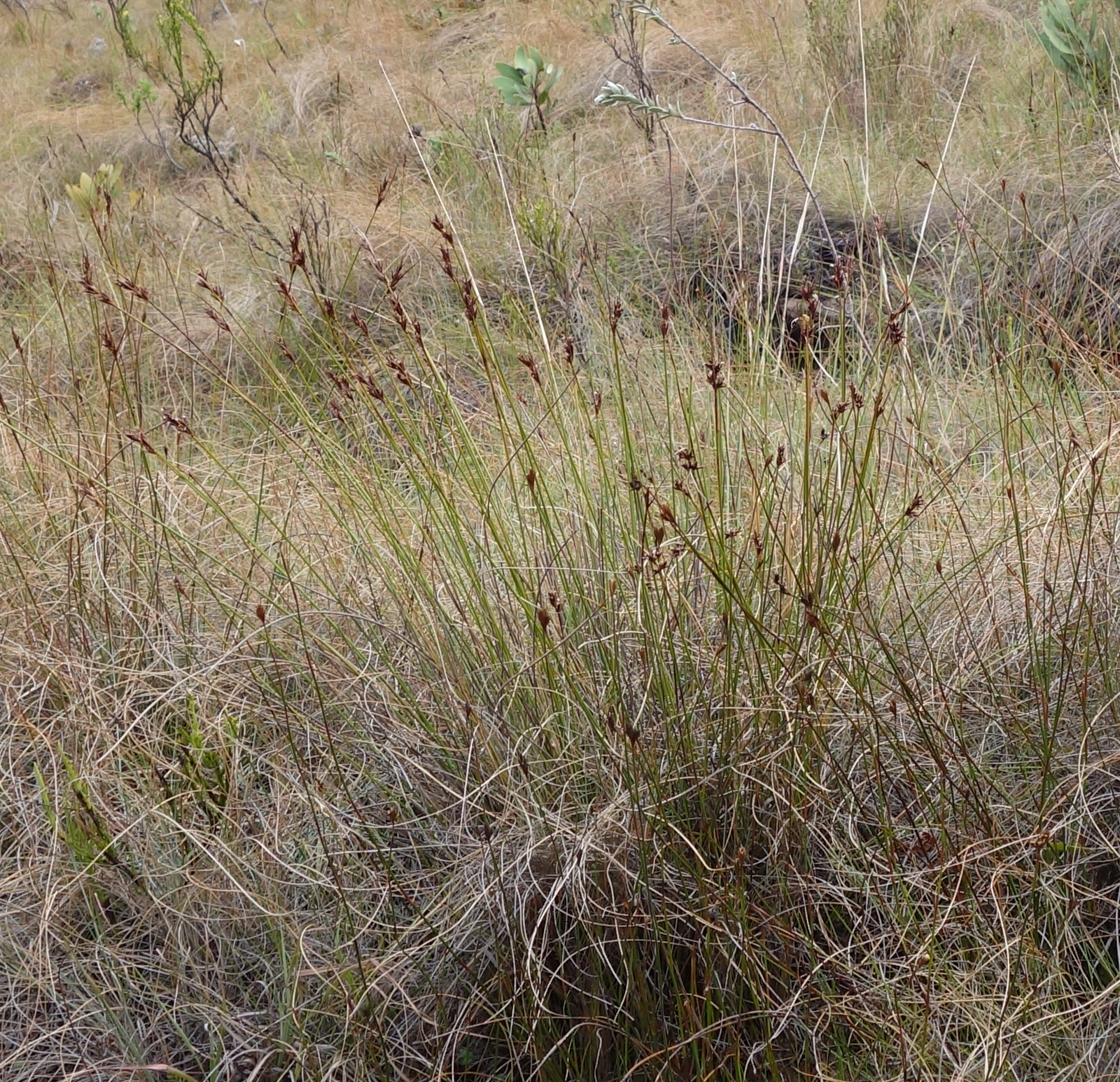
Habitat of S. galpinii

Flowering head (inflorescence)

Spikelet

Nutlet

== Taxonomy ==
Schoenus galpinii is a species in family Cyperaceae, tribe Schoeneae. Other notable genera in tribe Schoeneae include Lepidosperma, Oreobolus, Costularia, Tetraria and Gahnia. The most closely related species to S. galpinii are other southern African Schoenus species, specifically, species in the S. cuspidatus and allies group.

Southern African Schoenus were once classified as Tetraria; however, based on molecular and morphological differences, we now know that the two groups are evolutionary distinct. To ensure that this group of sedges is monophyletic (i.e. the genus only has closely related species), several species of Epischoenus and the southern African Tetraria were transferred into Schoenus. In the field, the southern African Schoenus can be distinguished from Tetraria species by their lack of stem leaves and the absence of reticulate sheaths at the bases of the flowering stems.

== Distribution and habitat ==
Schoenus galpinii is a sedge species that generally grows in grassland habitats on mountain slopes in the Kwazulu-Natal and Eastern Cape Provinces of South Africa. This species has also been collected from eastern regions of Lesotho.
