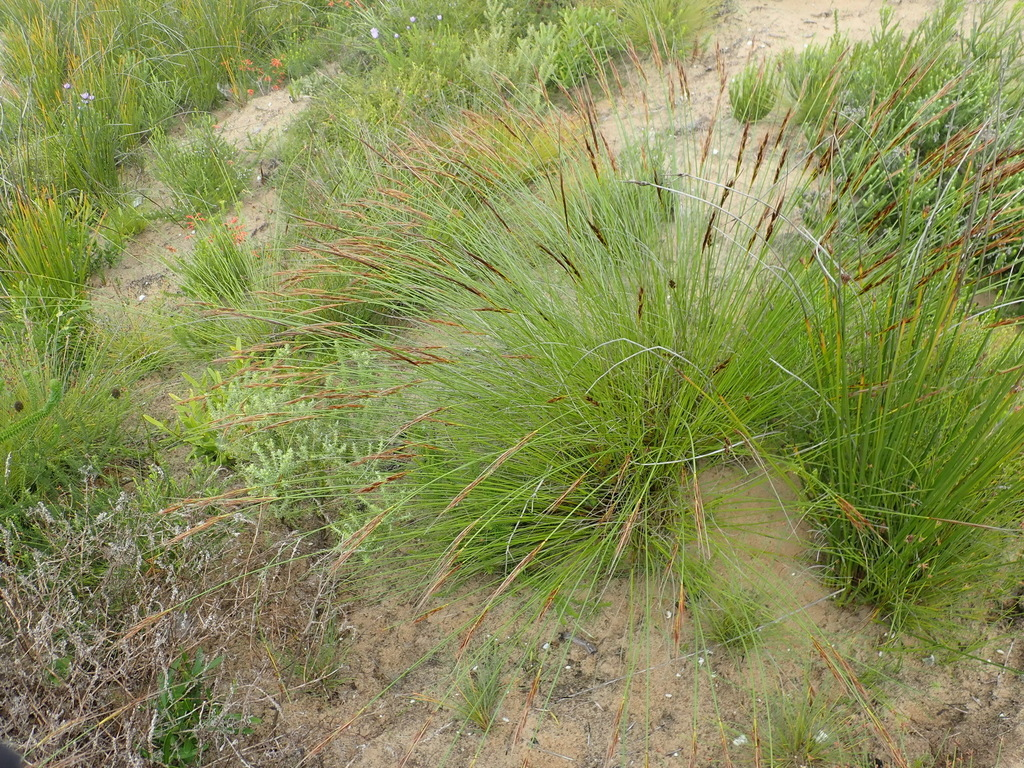
- Delicate veldrush

Scientific classification
- Kingdom: Plantae
- Clade: Tracheophytes
- Clade: Angiosperms
- Clade: Monocots
- Clade: Commelinids
- Order: Poales
- Family: Cyperaceae
- Genus: Schoenus
- Species: S. graciliculmis

Binomial name
- Schoenus graciliculmis T.L.Elliott & Muasya
- Documented collection localities in South Africa

= Schoenus graciliculmis =

Species of grass-like plant

Schoenus graciliculmis is a species of sedge endemic to regions of the southern Eastern Cape Province and nearby regions of the Western Cape Province of South Africa.

== Description ==
Schoenus graciliculmis has relatively thin culms and leaves compared to other species of southern African Schoenus. In addition, the leaves of this species are often over half of the height of the culms. Another key diagnostic character of S. graciliculmis is that it has aristate spikelets.

A species that could be confused with S. graciliculmis is Schoenus galpinii, since the distributions of these two species overlap around the Amathole Mountains in the Eastern Cape Province. Spikelet form differentiates these two species, as the spikelets of S. graciliculmis are aristate in shape, whereas those of S. galpinii are cuspidate. Furthermore, the growth form of S. galpinii tends to be more robust compared to S. graciliculmis, with leaves that are usually less than half the length of the culms.

A second species that could be confused with S. graciliculmis is Schoenus cuspidatus, which is another species that has culm leaves that are often less than half the length of the culms. Schoenus cuspidatus is generally more robust in form compared to S. graciliculmis and it has cuspidate spikelets, not the aristate spikelets of S. cuspidatus. The distributions of the two species overlap in the Grahamstown area of the Eastern Cape Province.

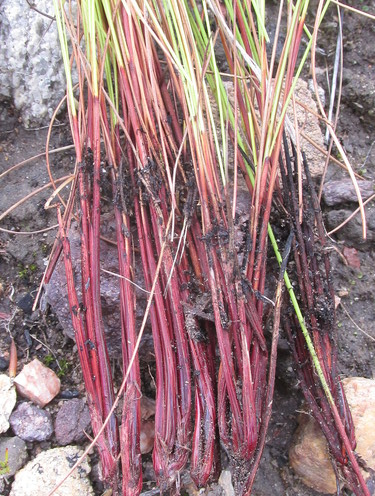
Bases of culms

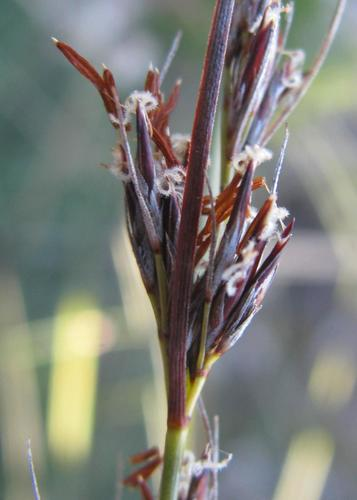
Inflorescence

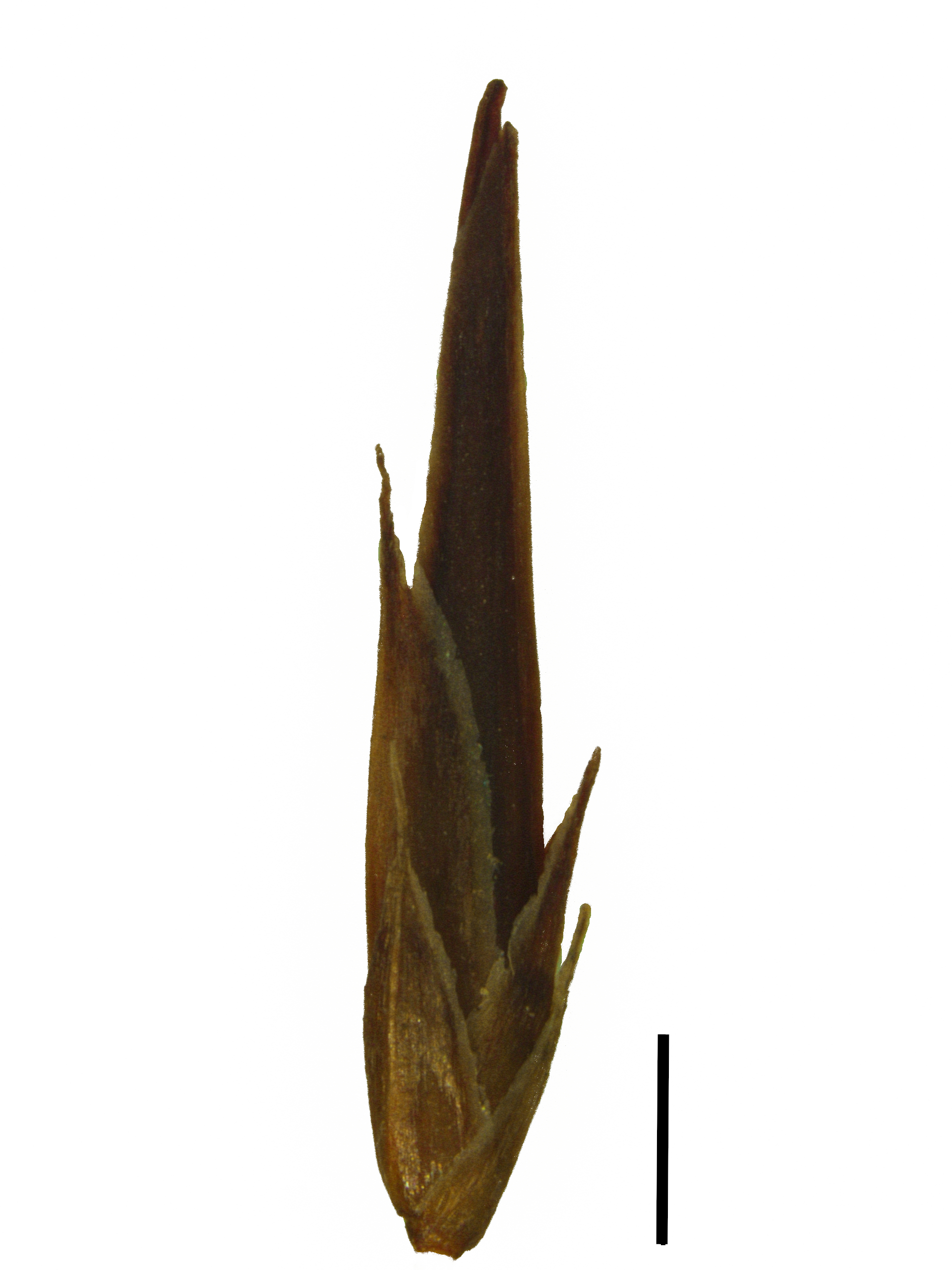
Spikelet (the black scale bar represents 1 mm)

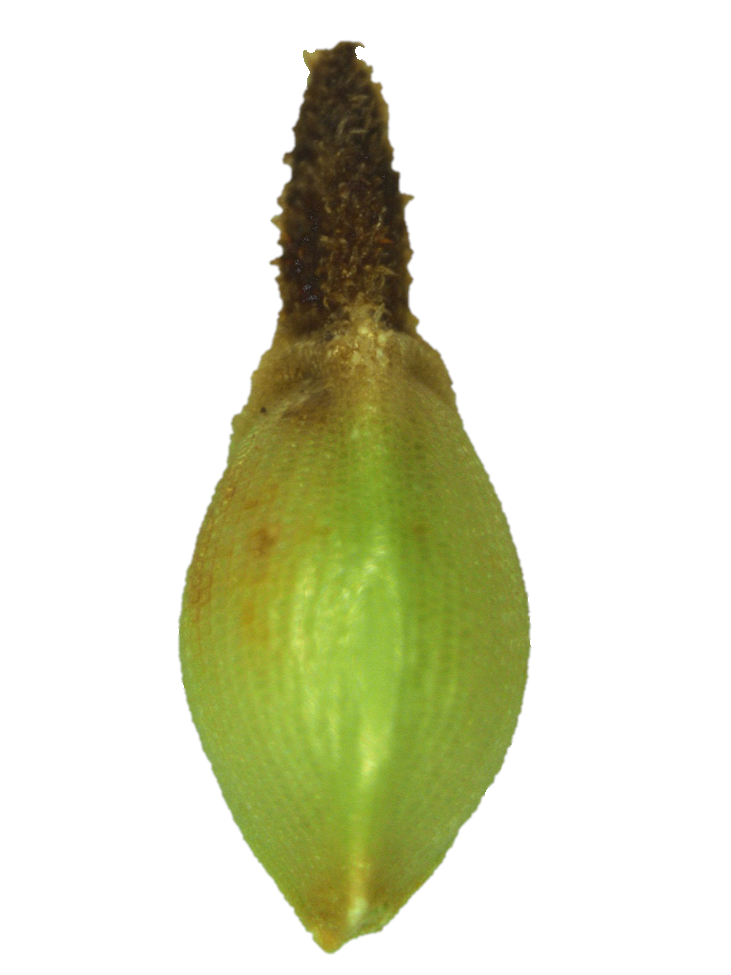
Nutlet (fruit)

== Taxonomy ==
Schoenus graciliculmis is a species in family Cyperaceae, tribe Schoeneae, which is a clade of sedges that includes genera such as Costularia, Lepidosperma, Oreobolus, Tetraria and Gahnia. Closely related species to Schoenus graciliculmis include species in the S. cuspidatus and allies group of the southern African Schoenus.

The genus Tetraria once included the southern African Schoenus; however, we now know that the two groups are evolutionary distinct based on molecular and morphological differences. Several species of Epischoenus and the southern African Tetraria were transferred into Schoenus to ensure that this group of sedges is monophyletic (i.e. the genus only has closely related species). The southern African Schoenus can be distinguished from Tetraria species in the field by the absence of reticulate sheaths at the bases of the flowering stems and their lack of stem leaves.

== Distribution and habitat ==
Schoenus graciliculmis has been reported from eastern regions of the Western Cape Province and adjacent areas in the Eastern Cape Province of South Africa.

A young specimen resembling S. graciliculmis was collected from the Uasin Gishu Plateau region of Kenya, but it is not clear if this plant is S. graciliculmis because of its immature reproductive characters.

Many collections of S. graciliculmis have been made from wet areas, but this species has also been collected from grassland slopes, renosterveld and fynbos vegetation types.

The documented elevation range of this species is from near sea level to over 1600 m.

== Gallery ==
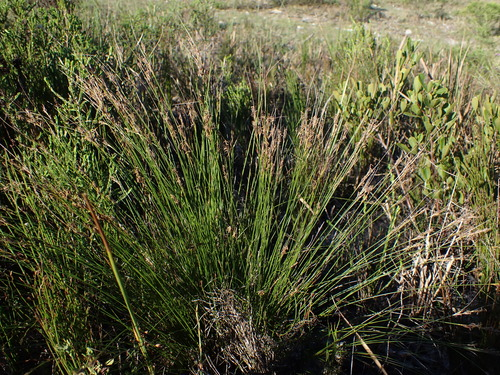
Growth form

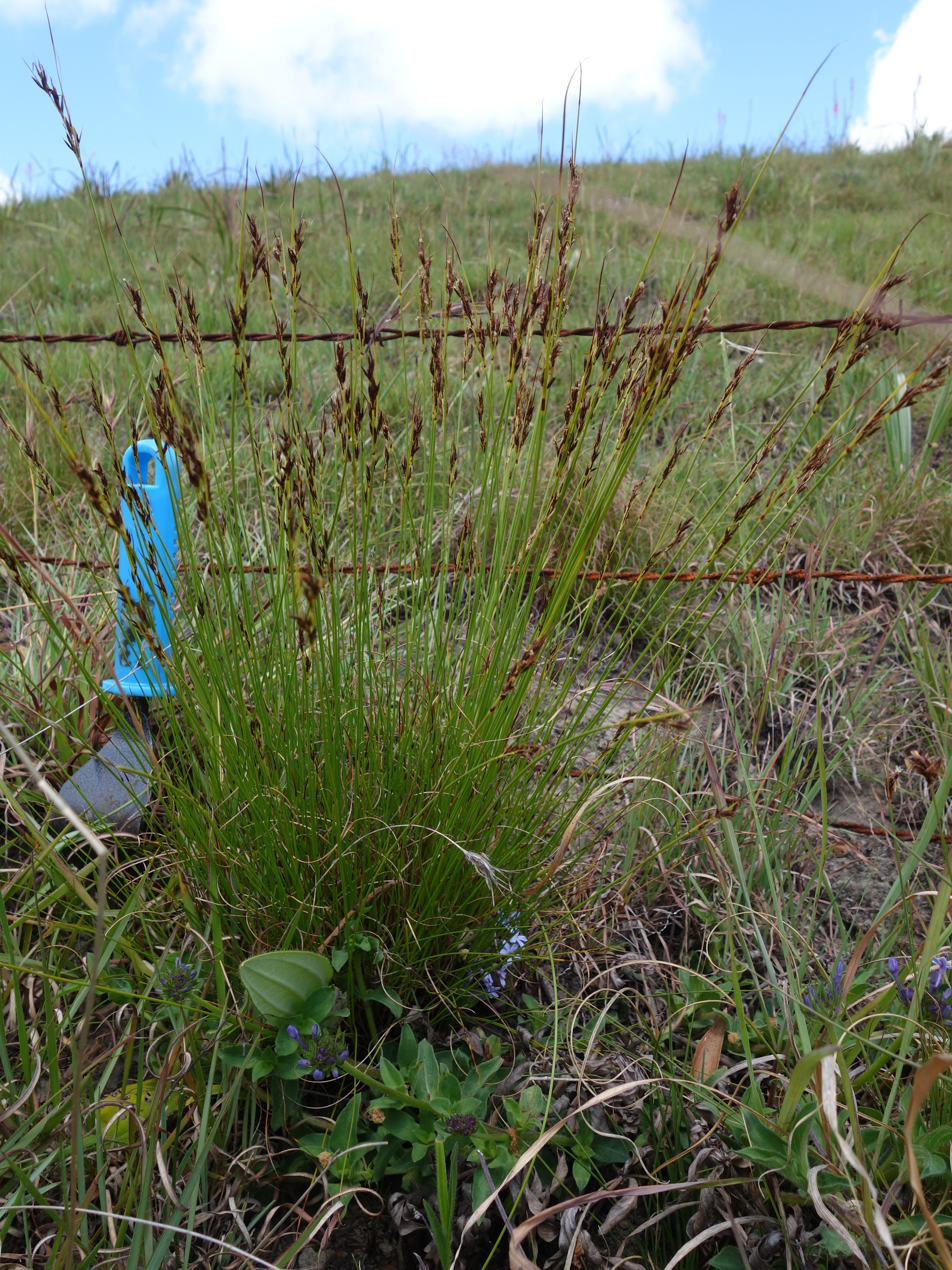
Growth form

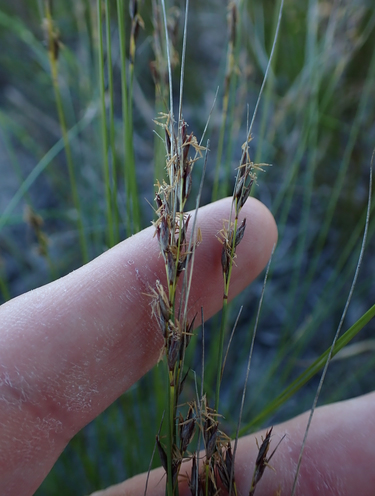
Flowering heads

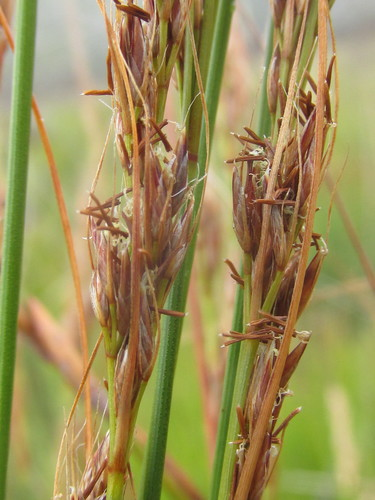
Flowering heads
