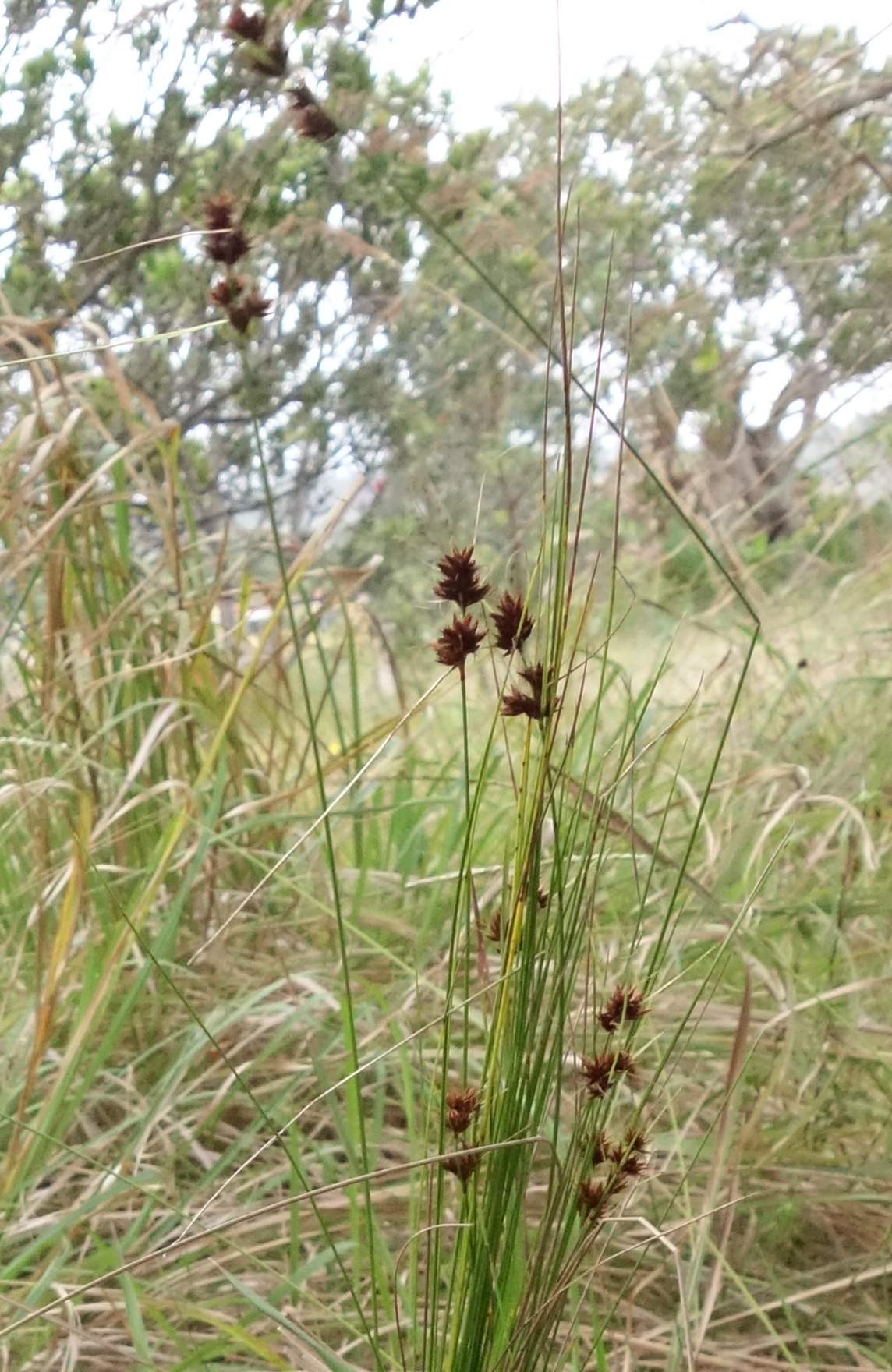
- Muddy veldrush

Scientific classification
- Kingdom: Plantae
- Clade: Tracheophytes
- Clade: Angiosperms
- Clade: Monocots
- Clade: Commelinids
- Order: Poales
- Family: Cyperaceae
- Genus: Schoenus
- Species: S. limosus

Binomial name
- Schoenus limosus T.L.Elliott & Muasya
- Documented collection localities

= Schoenus limosus =

Species of grass-like plant

Schoenus limosus is a species of sedge endemic to the KwaZulu-Natal and Eastern Cape provinces of South Africa. It is predominantly a species of wet grasslands, which explains its common name (Muddy Veldrush).

== Description ==
Schoenus limosus is relatively tall compared to other closely related sedges. The bases of its flowering stems (i.e. culms) are often dark-red to black in colour. The spikelets of S. limosus are usually lanceolate in shape, greater than 4.0 mm in length and medium brown in colour. Furthermore, the spikelets of this species are aristate in shape, with the glumes and mucros (i.e. awns) usually over half the length of the spikelet.

Other closely related species in the Schoenus cuspidatus and allies group usually have culm bases that are lighter in colour compared to those of S. limosus.

Schoenus auritus is a species that shares some key characters with S. limosus, such as lanceolate spikelets over 4.0 mm long that are aristate in form. Whereas the leaf sheaths and ligules of S. limosus are firm, those of S. auritus are membranaceous. In addition, the proximal primary inflorescence bracts are often widened at the base in S. auritus, whereas in S. limosus this character is not evident.

Similar to other sedges, plants in this group are very difficult to identify. It appears that part of this problem is caused by the tendency of the southern African Schoenus to form hybrids with each other. Schoenus limosus does not appear to be of hybrid origin.

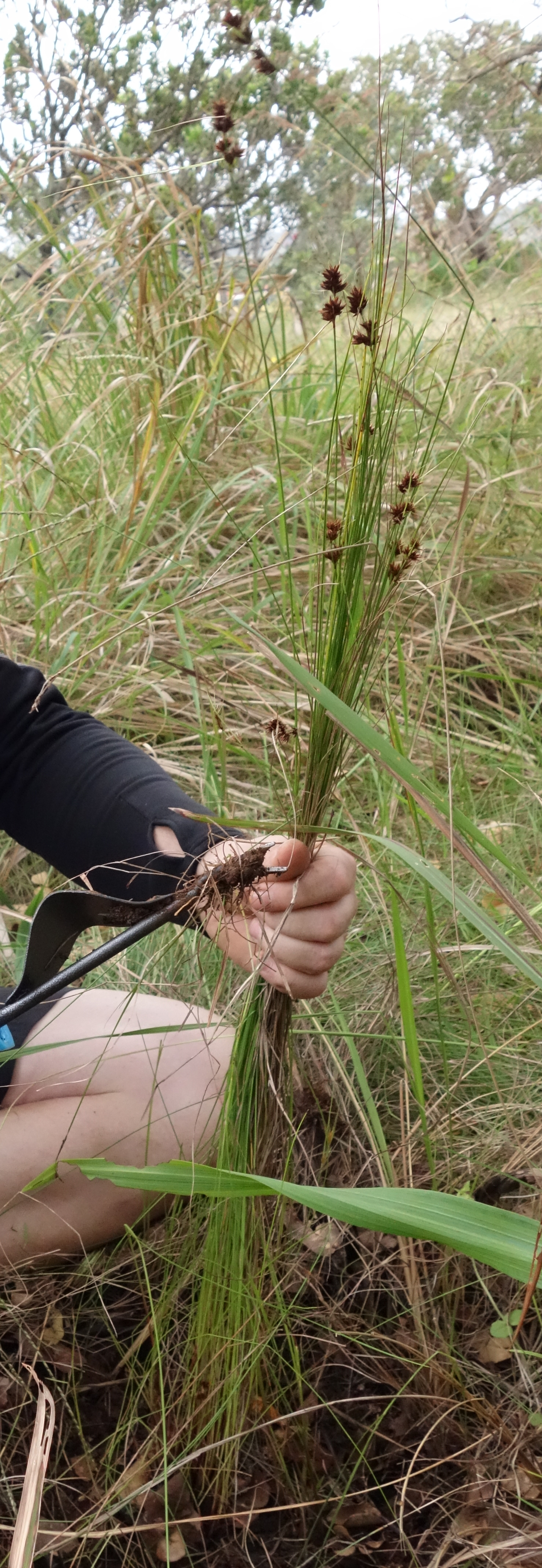
Flowering heads

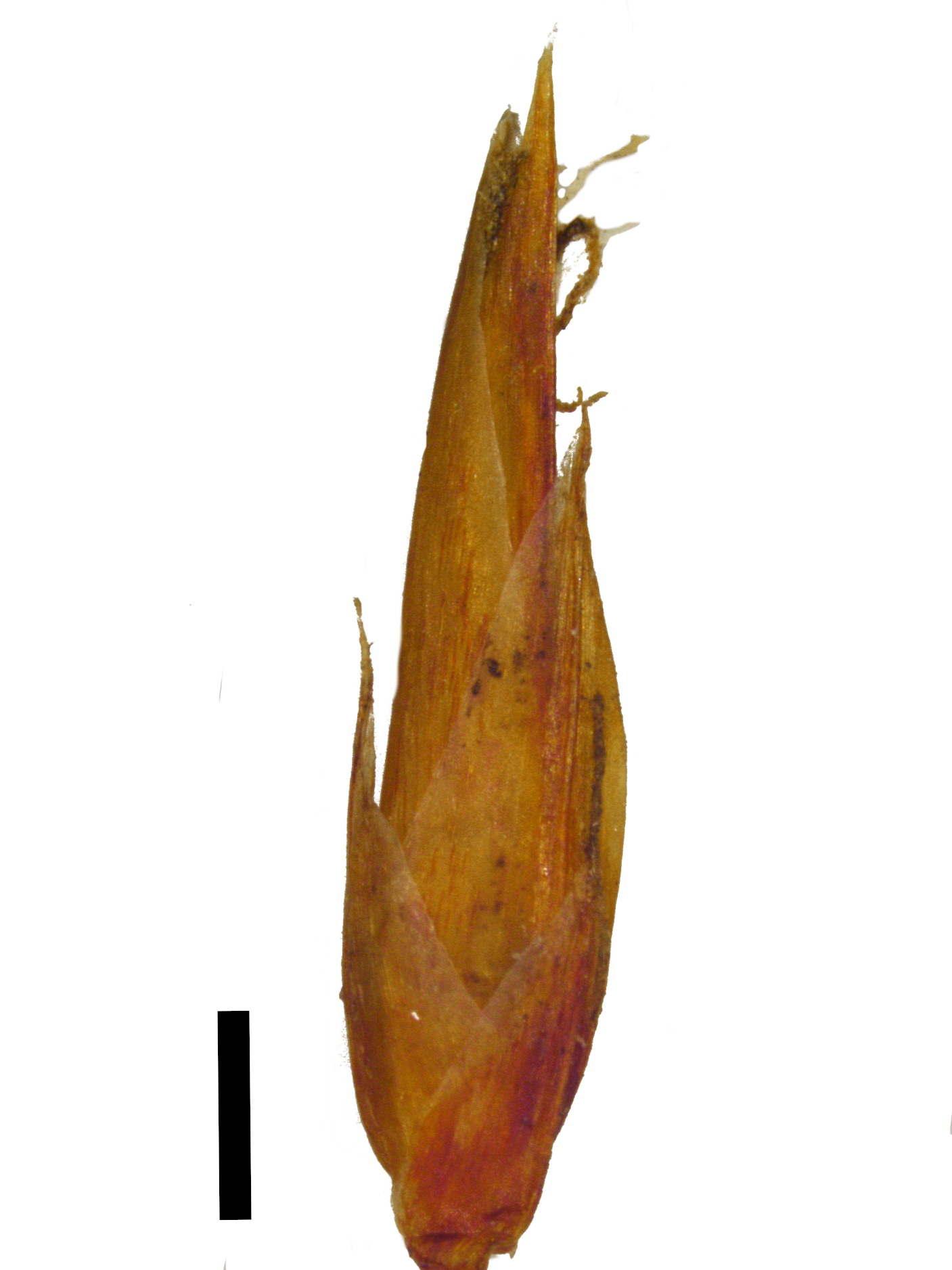
Spikelet (black scale bar represents 1 mm)

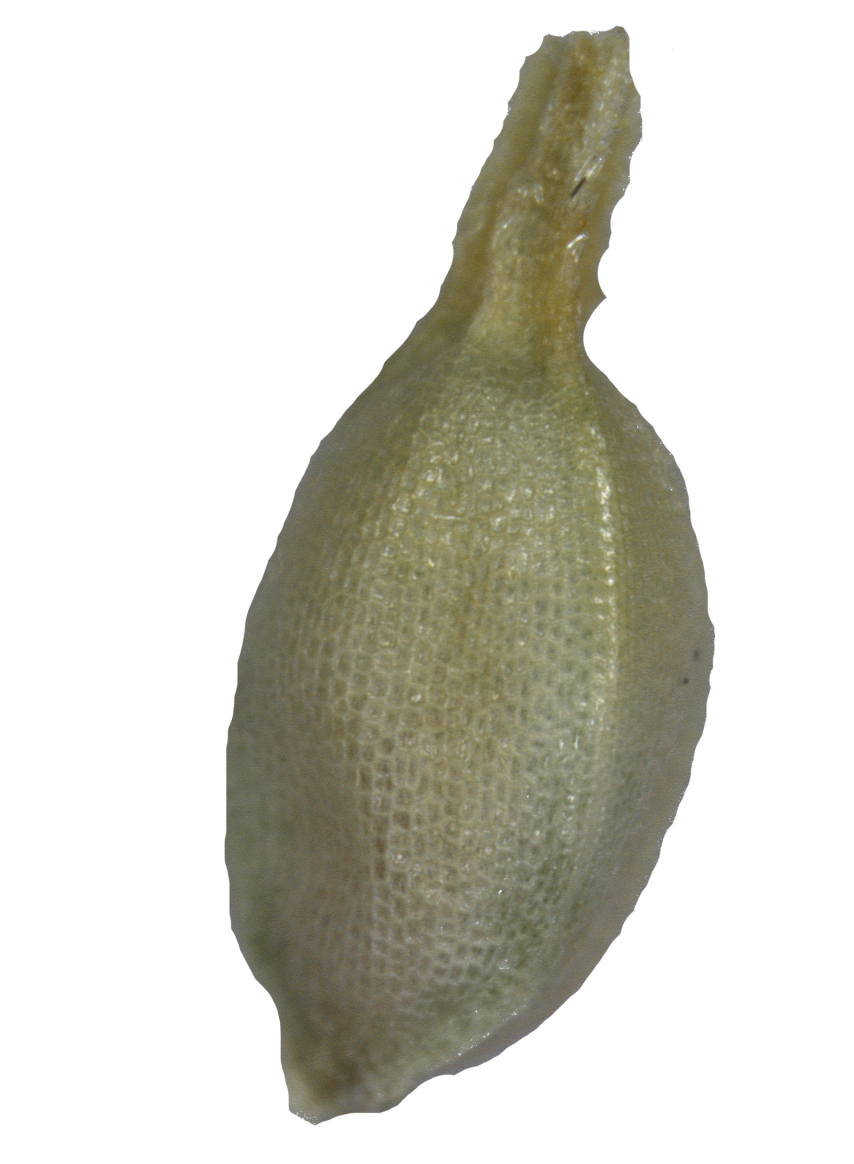
Nutlet

== Taxonomy ==
Schoenus limosus is a species in family Cyperaceae, tribe Schoeneae. Other notable genera in tribe Schoeneae include Lepidosperma, Oreobolus, Costularia, Tetraria and Gahnia. The most closely related species to S. limosus are other southern African Schoenus species, specifically, species in the S. cuspidatus and allies group that are endemic to the Eastern Cape and Kwa-Zulu Natal Provinces of South Africa.

Southern African Schoenus were once classified as Tetraria; however, based on molecular and morphological differences, we now know that the two groups are evolutionary distinct. To ensure that this group of sedges is monophyletic (i.e. the genus only has closely related species), several species of Epischoenus and the southern African Tetraria were transferred into Schoenus. In the field, the southern African Schoenus can be distinguished from Tetraria species by their lack of stem leaves and the absence of reticulate sheaths at the bases of the flowering stems.

== Distribution and habitat ==
The distribution of S. limosus has a distribution that ranges from the KwaZulu-Natal Province in the north-east to the Amathole Mountains region of the Eastern Cape Province in the south-west. It is a species that mostly grows in muddy grassland sites, but collections have also been made from sandier, drier sites. The elevational range of S. limosus is from near sea level to about 1500 meters.

== Images ==
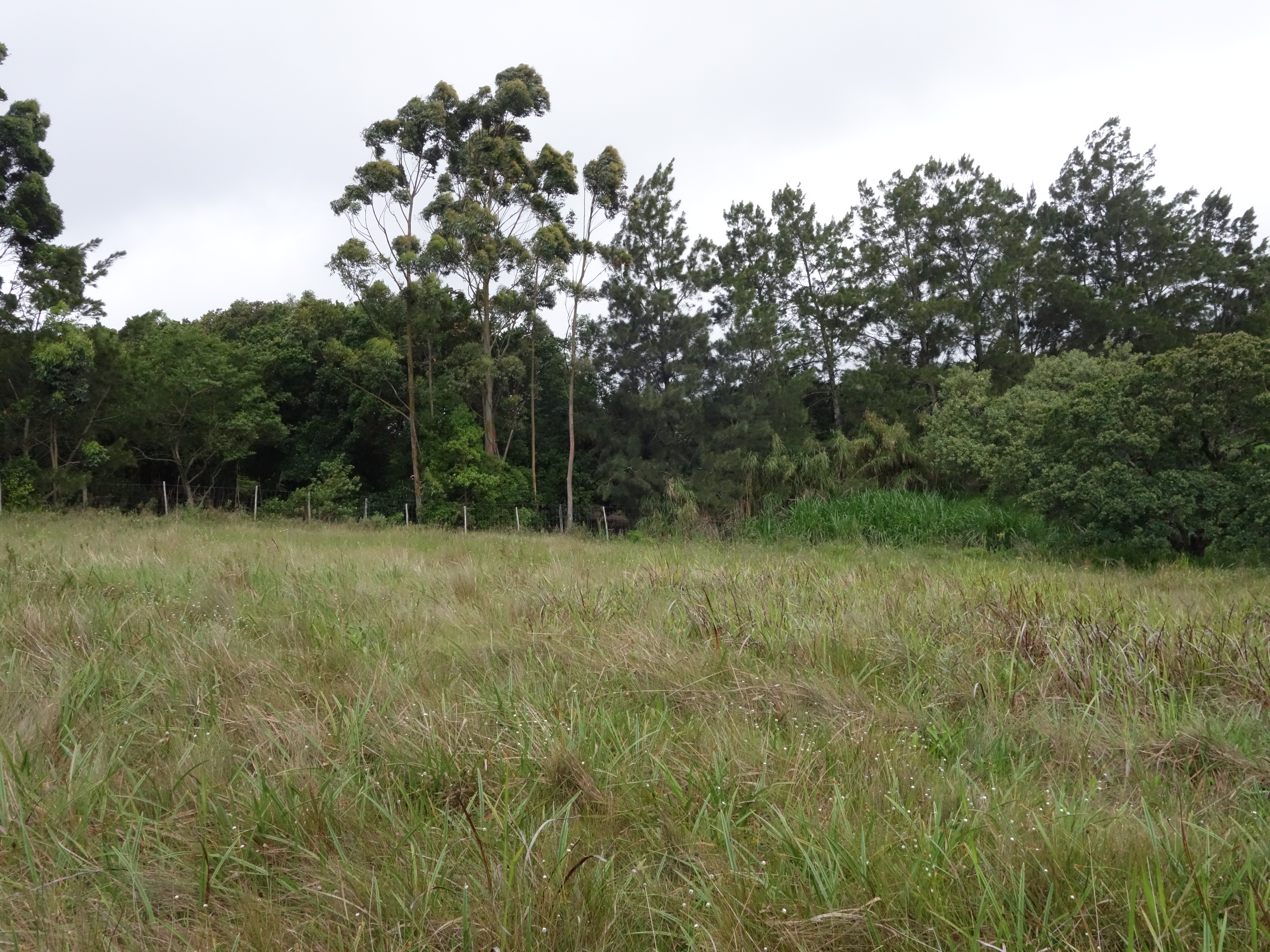
Habitat of S. limosus

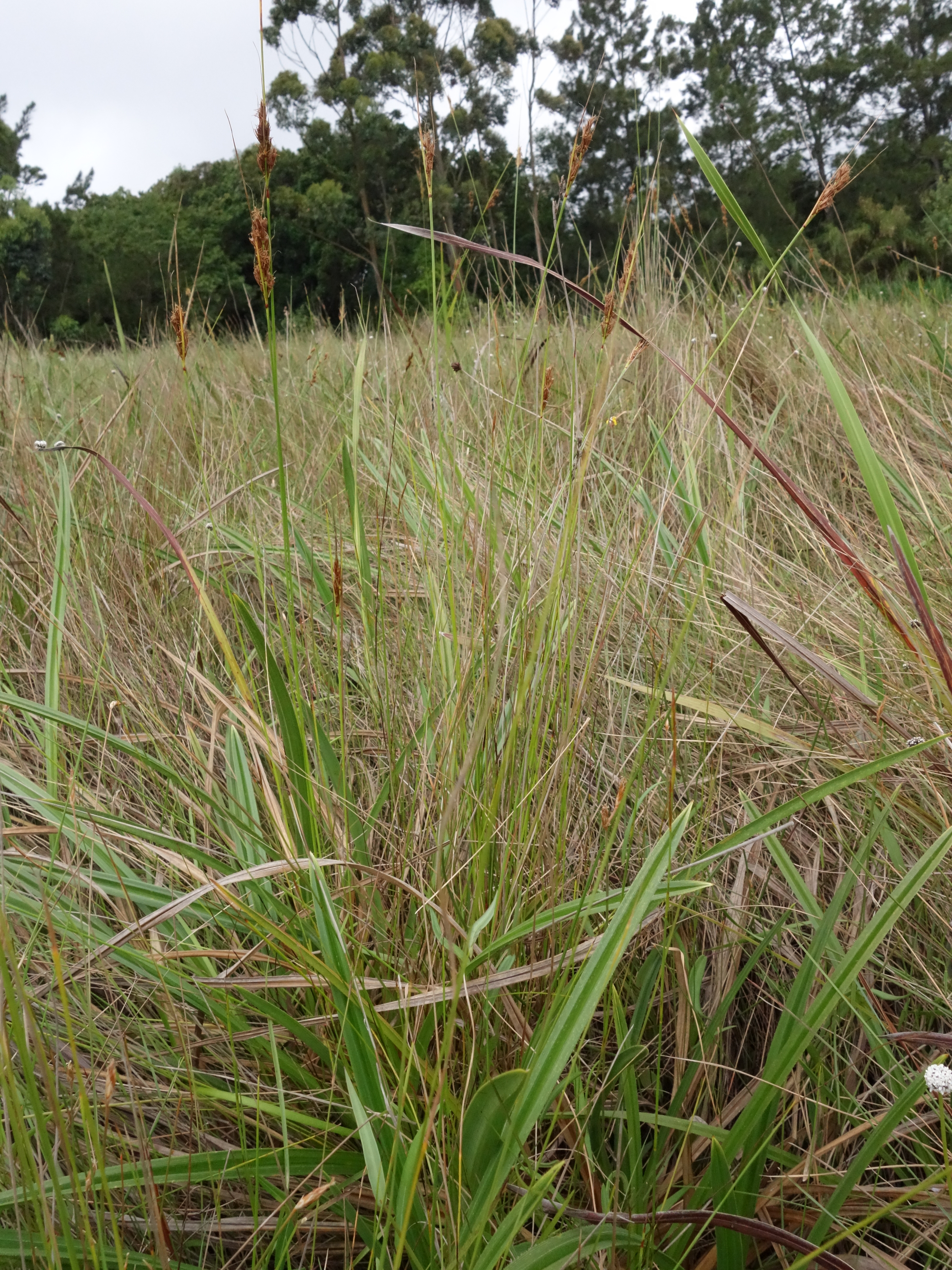
Flowering heads

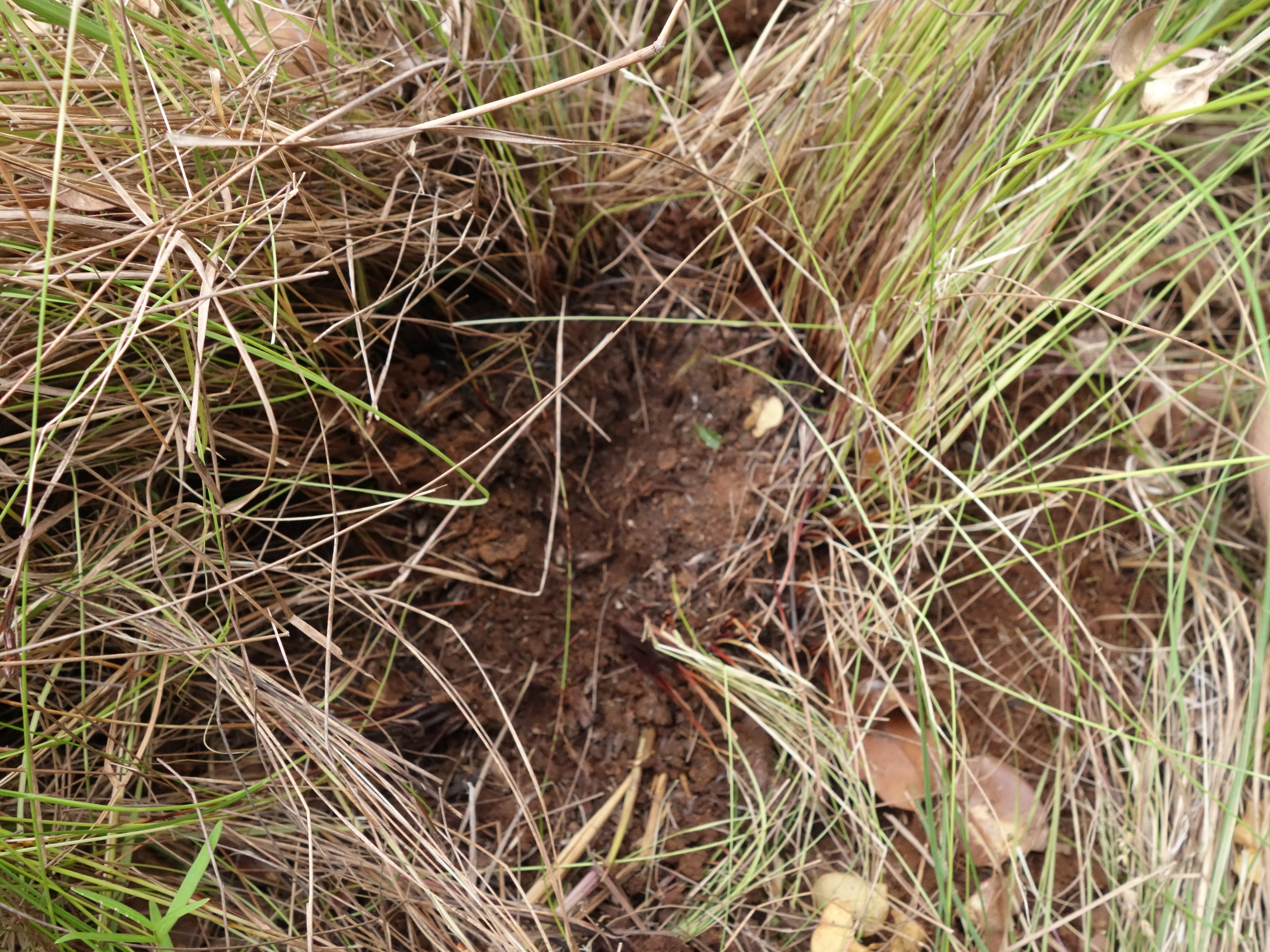
Culm bases of S. limosus
