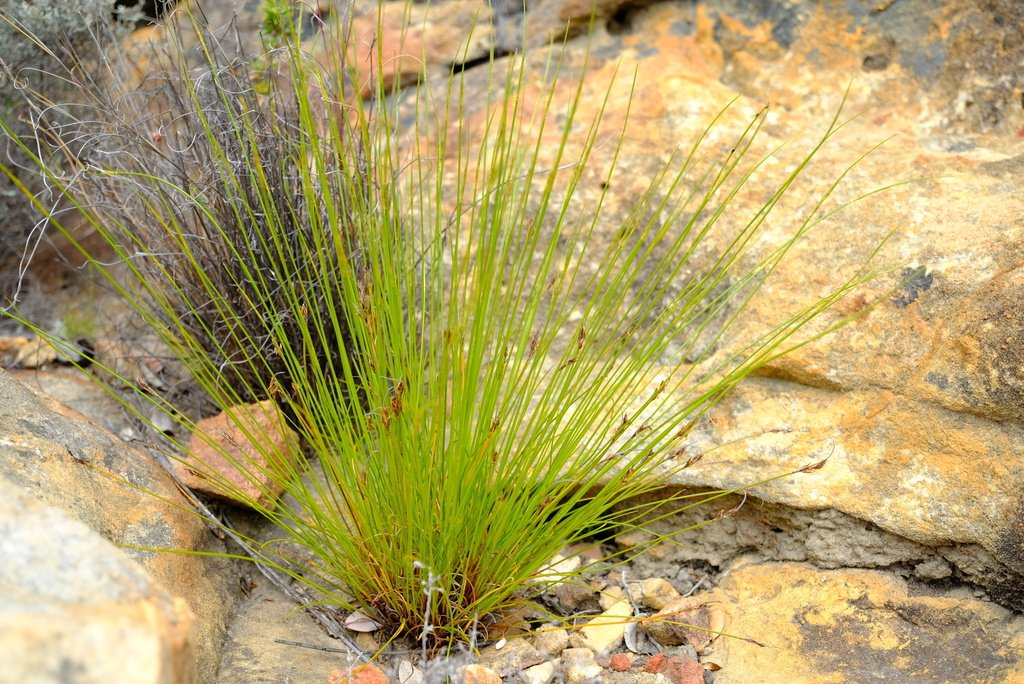
- Succulent veldrush

Scientific classification
- Kingdom: Plantae
- Clade: Tracheophytes
- Clade: Angiosperms
- Clade: Monocots
- Clade: Commelinids
- Order: Poales
- Family: Cyperaceae
- Genus: Schoenus
- Species: S. crassiculmis

Binomial name
- Schoenus crassiculmis T.L.Elliott & Muasya
- Documented collection localities

= Schoenus crassiculmis =

Species of grass-like plant

Schoenus crassiculmis is a species of sedge endemic to the mountains of the Western Cape Province of South Africa. Few collections of this species have also been made from western areas of the Eastern Cape Province.

== Description ==
Schoenus crassiculmis is a sedge that appears semi-succulent in the field. Other important characters are its basal leaves that are reduced in length and the relatively short lower glumes of its spikelets.

In the field, Schoenus auritus also appears semi-succulent, but that species generally has longer leaves (usually half the length of the flowering stems). Schoenus crassiculmis, in contrast, has basal leaves that never exceed half the length of the flowering stems. The lower spikelet glumes of S. crassiculmis are relatively short compared to those of S. auritus, whose glumes mostly exceed half the spikelet length. Another important difference between the two species are that S. auritus has membranaceous leaf sheaths, whereas S. crassiculmis does not. Finally, S. auritus has proximal and subproximal primary inflorescence bracts that are more expanded at their bases than in S. crassiculmis.

Similar to other sedges, plants in this group are very difficult to identify. It appears that part of this problem is caused by the tendency of the southern African Schoenus to form hybrids with each other. From preliminary evidence, S. crassiculmis appears to be of hybrid origin.

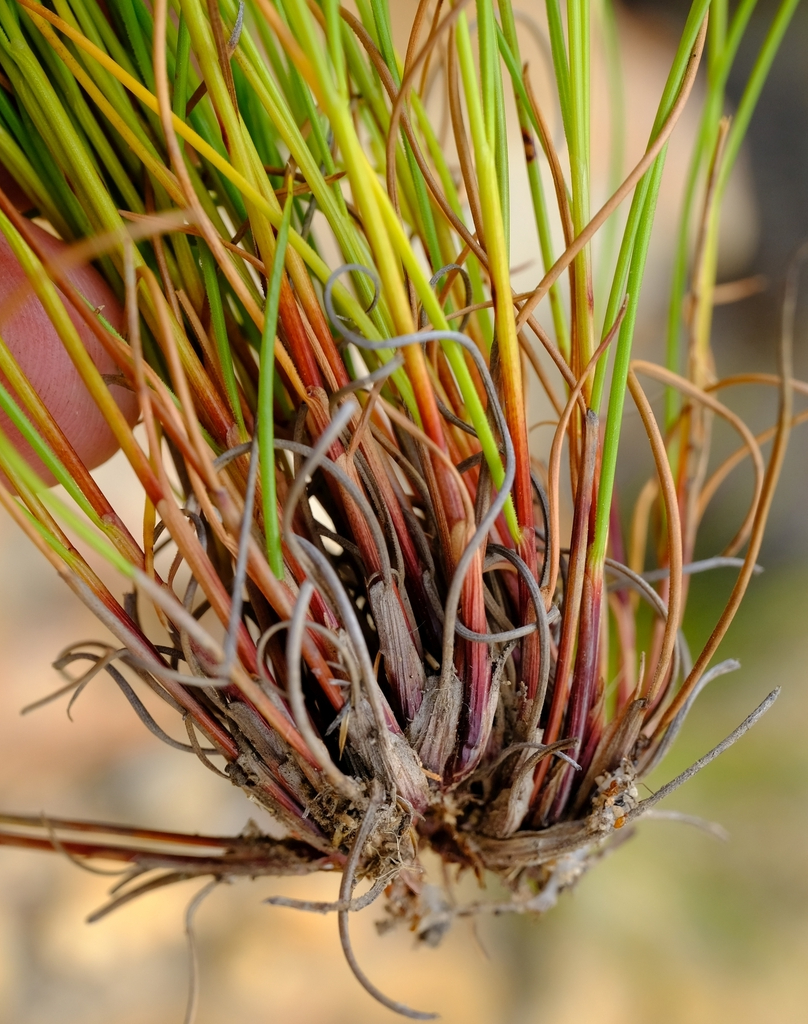
Bases of flowering stems

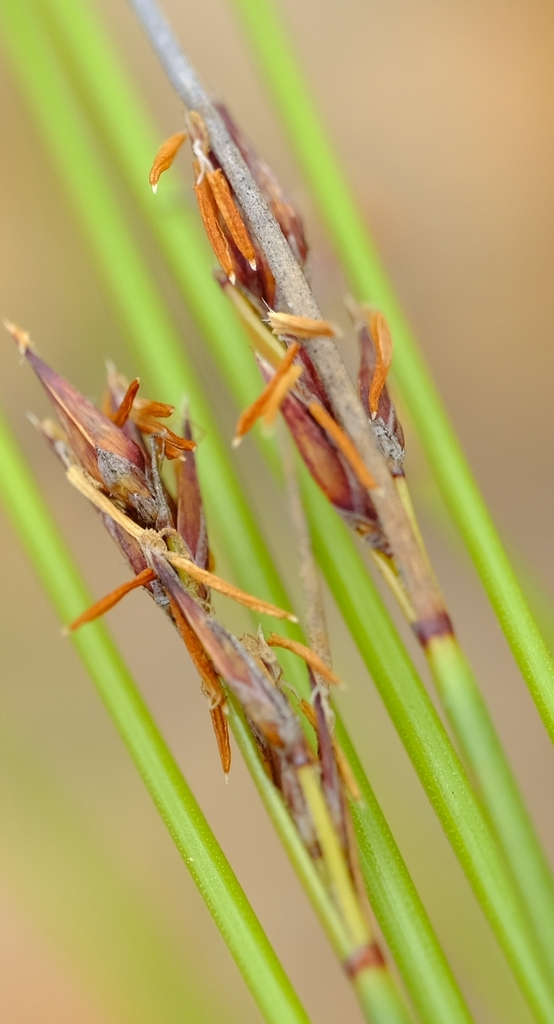
Flowering heads

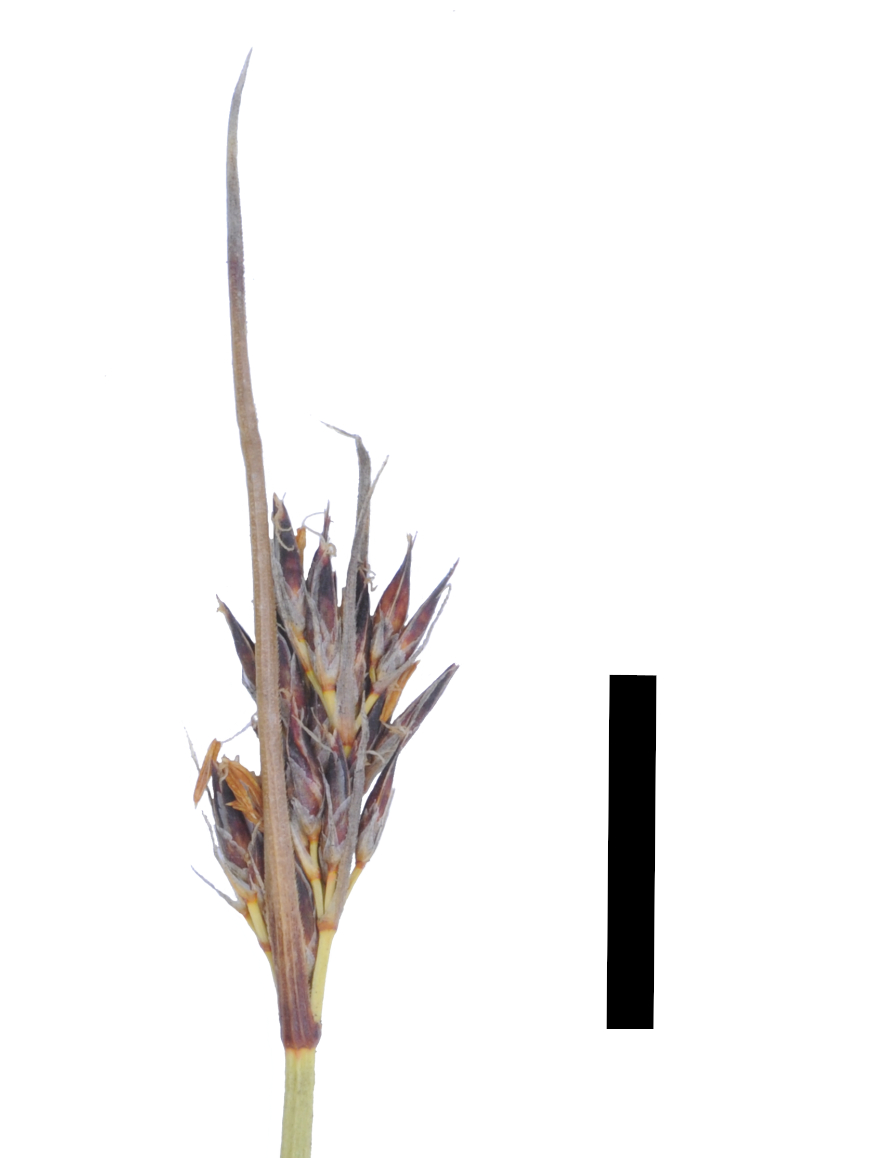
Flowering head (black scale bar represents 10 mm)

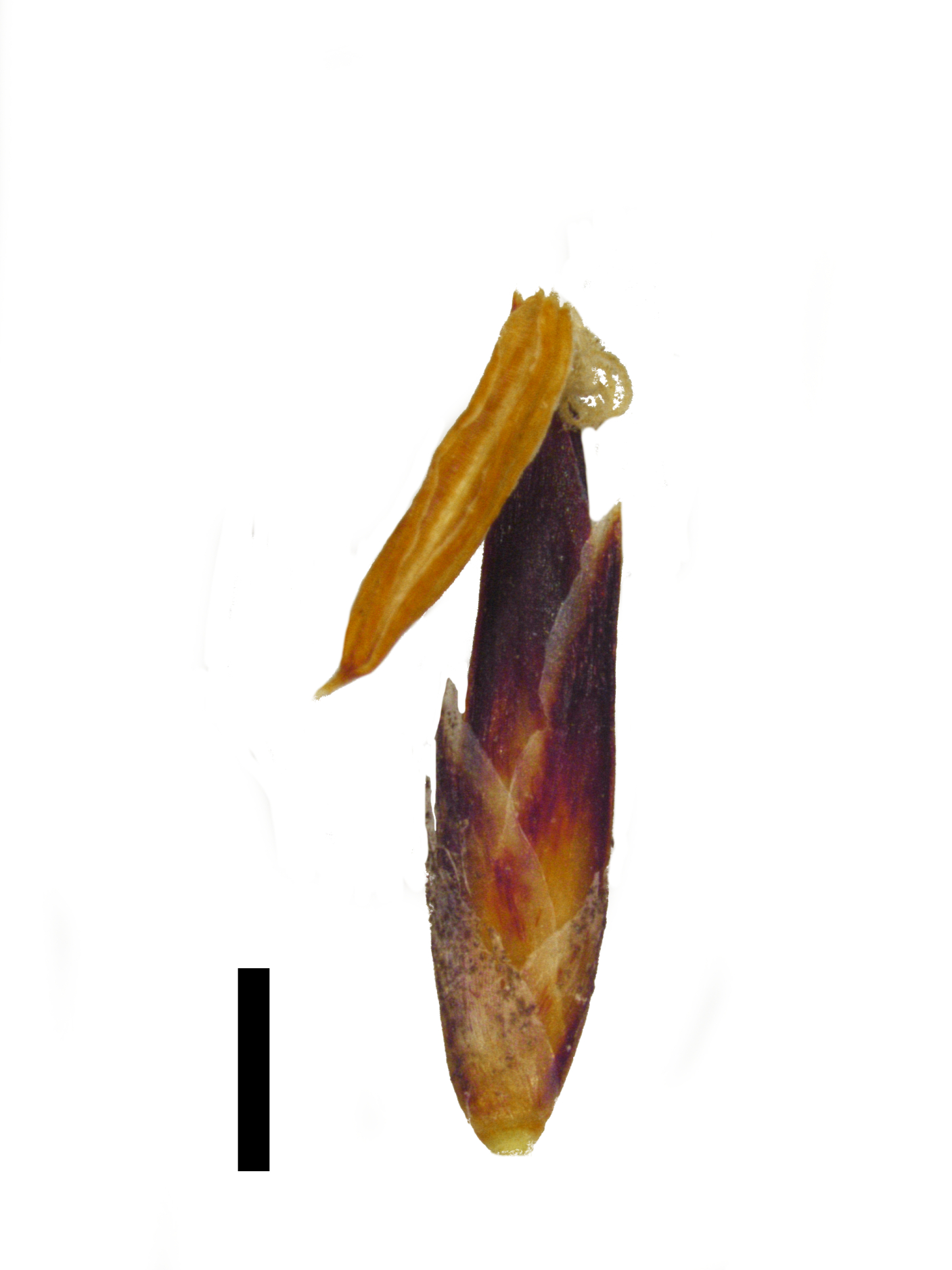
Spikelet (black scale bar represents 1 mm)

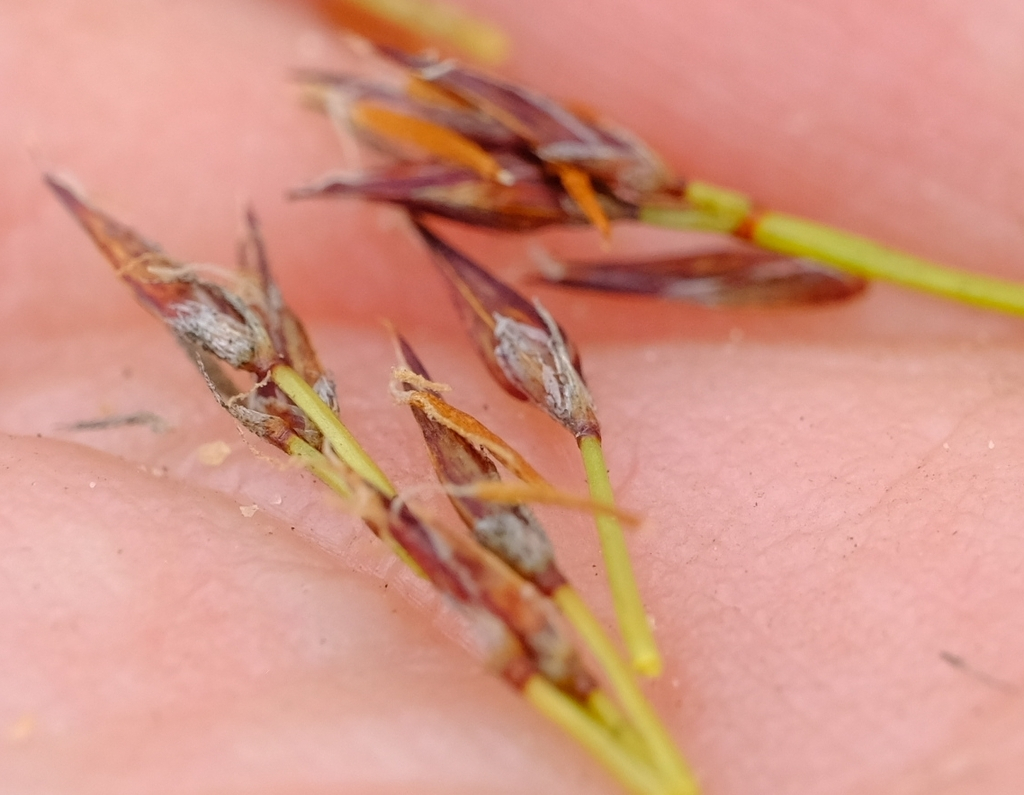
Clusters of spikelets

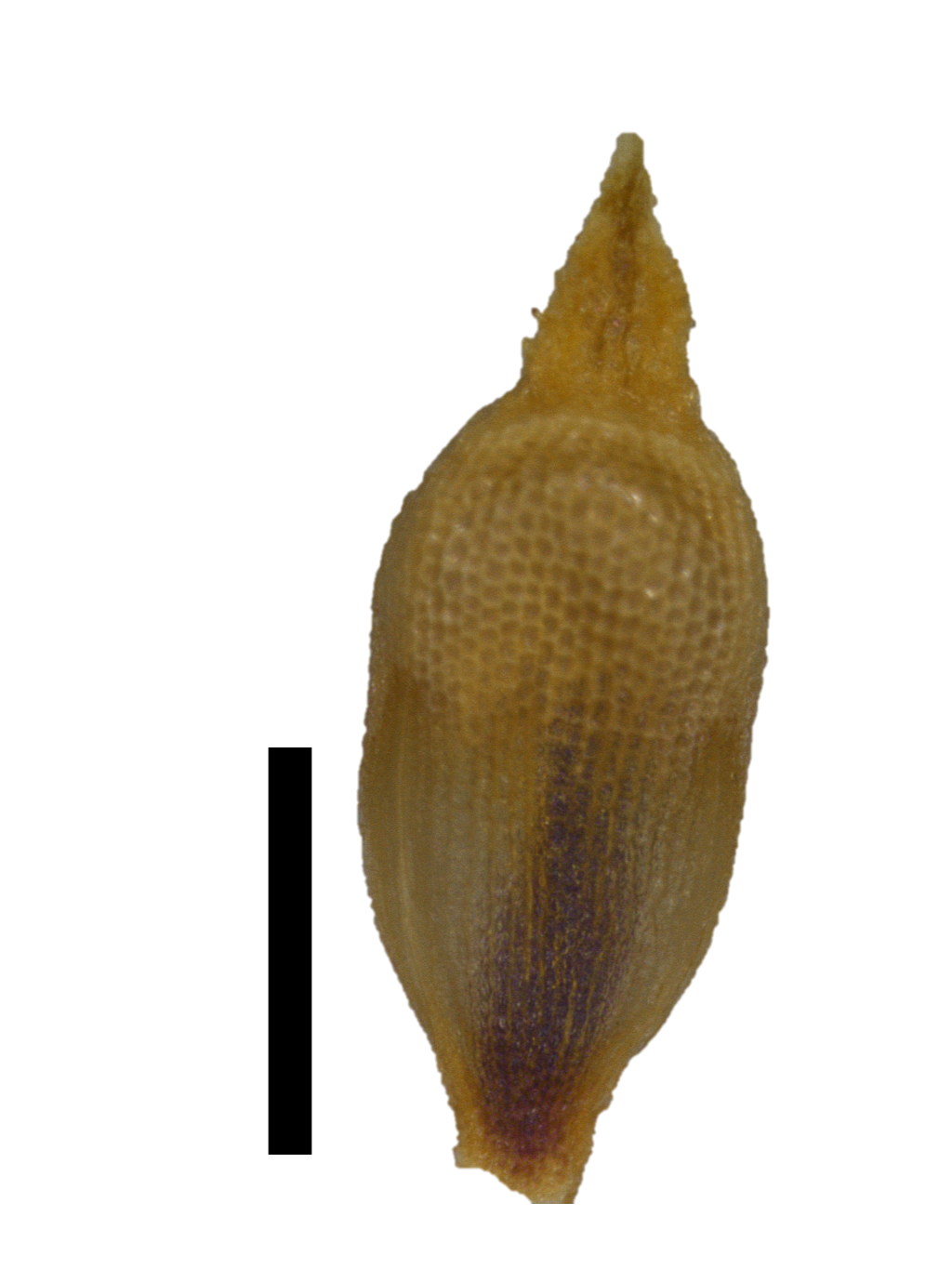
Nutlet (black scale bar represents 1 mm)

== Taxonomy ==
Schoenus crassiculmis is a species in family Cyperaceae, tribe Schoeneae. Other notable genera in tribe Schoeneae include Lepidosperma, Oreobolus, Costularia, Tetraria and Gahnia. The most closely related species to S. crassiculmis are other southern African Schoenus species, specifically, species in the S. cuspidatus and allies group.

Southern African Schoenus were once classified as Tetraria; however, based on molecular and morphological differences, we now know that the two groups are evolutionary distinct. To ensure that this group of sedges is monophyletic (i.e. the genus only has closely related species), several species of Epischoenus and the southern African Tetraria were transferred into Schoenus. In the field, the southern African Schoenus can be distinguished from Tetraria species by their lack of stem leaves and the absence of reticulate sheaths at the bases of the flowering stems.

== Distribution and habitat ==
Schoenus crassiculmis has a distribution that ranges from the Worcester area of the Western Cape Province in the west to the Willowmore area of the Eastern Cape Province in the east. This species has predominately been collected from sandstone-derived mountain slopes, but a few collections have also been made from sites with shale parent material.

== Images ==
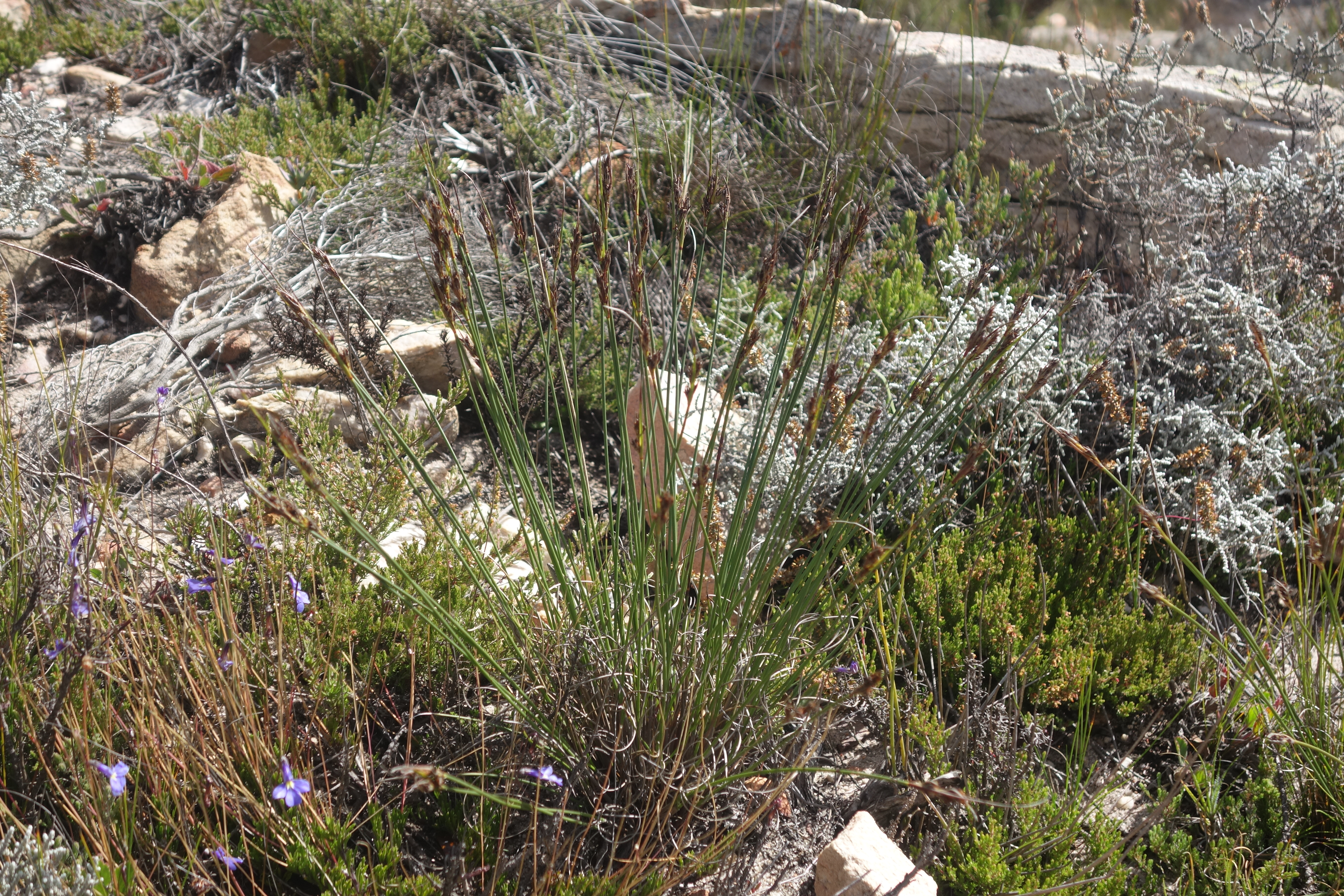
Growth form

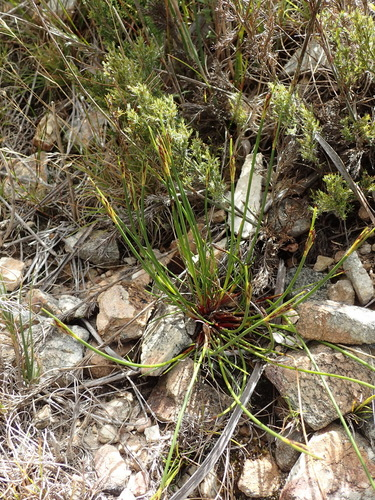
Growth form

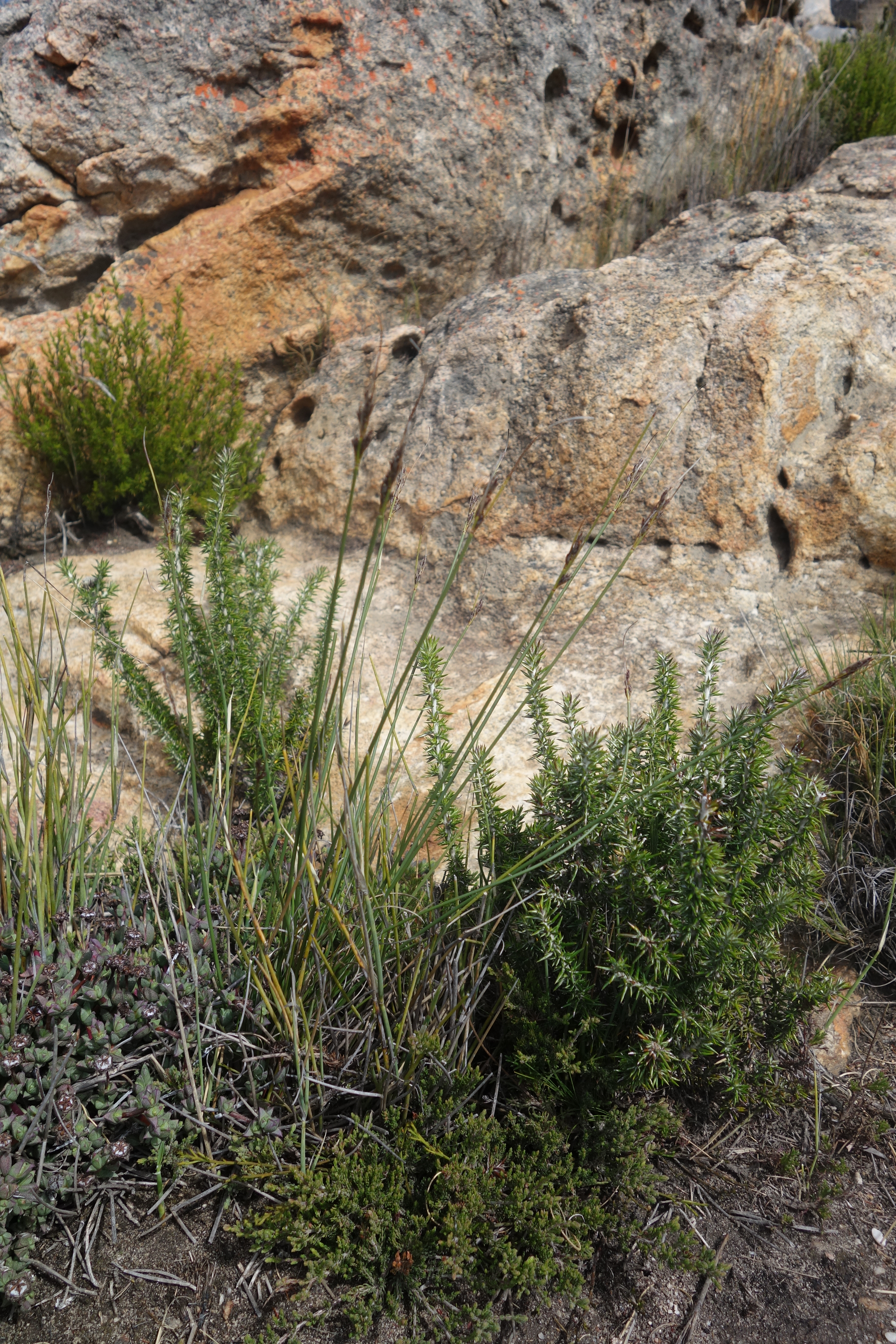
Growth form

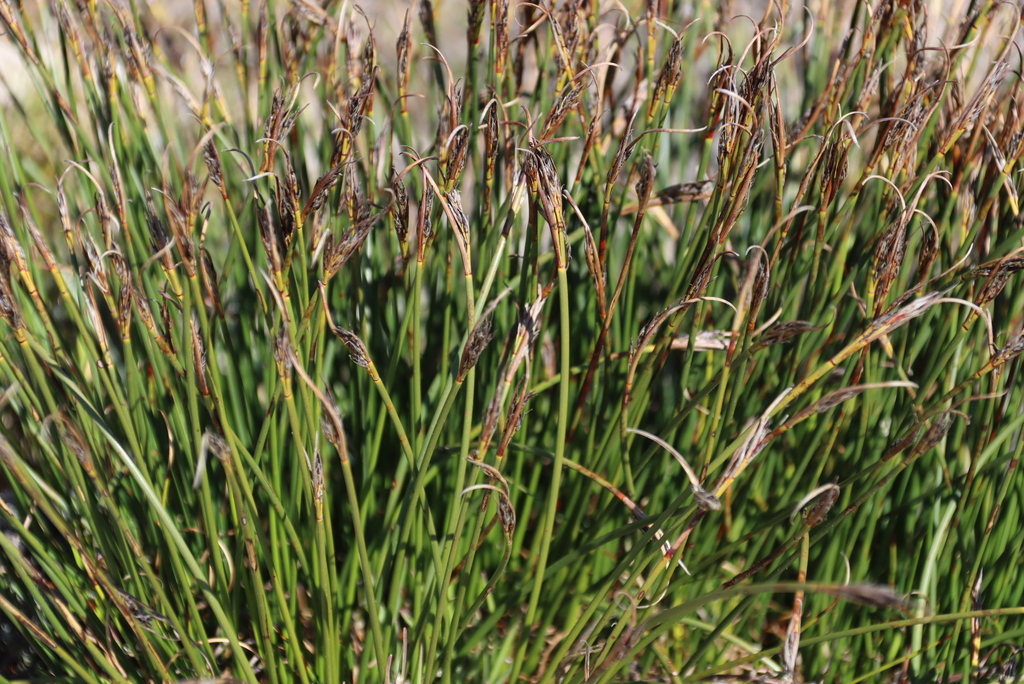
Flowering heads

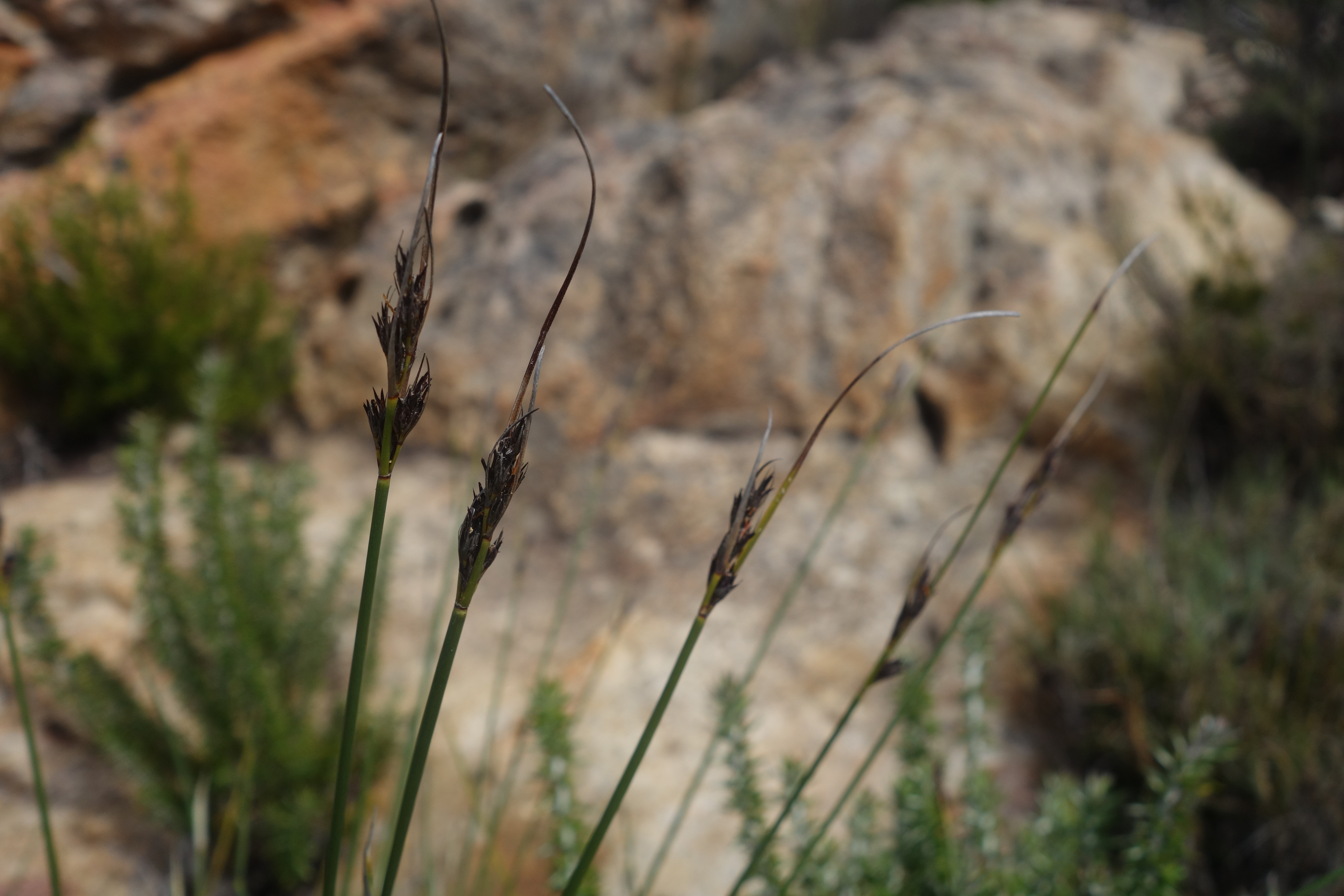
Flowering heads

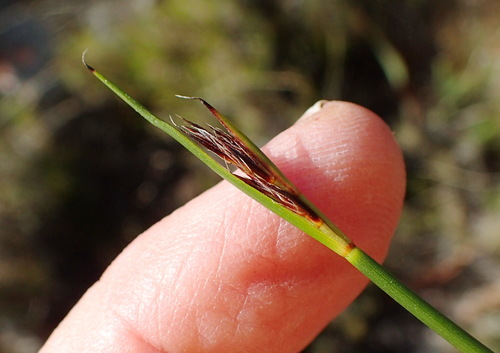
Close-up of flowering head

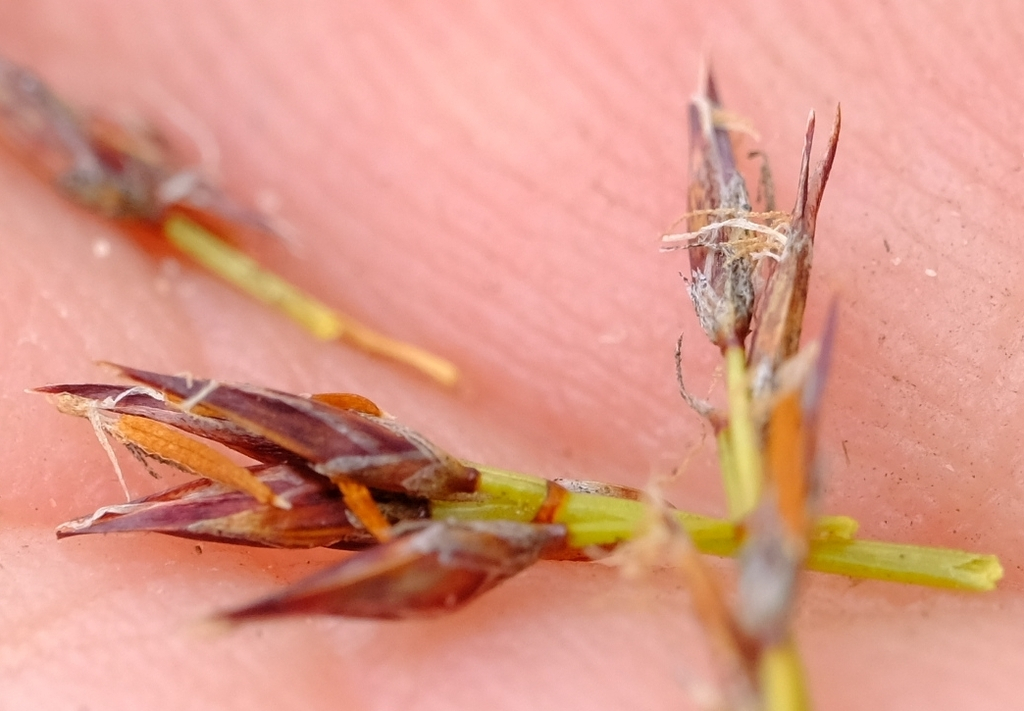
Clusters of spikelets
