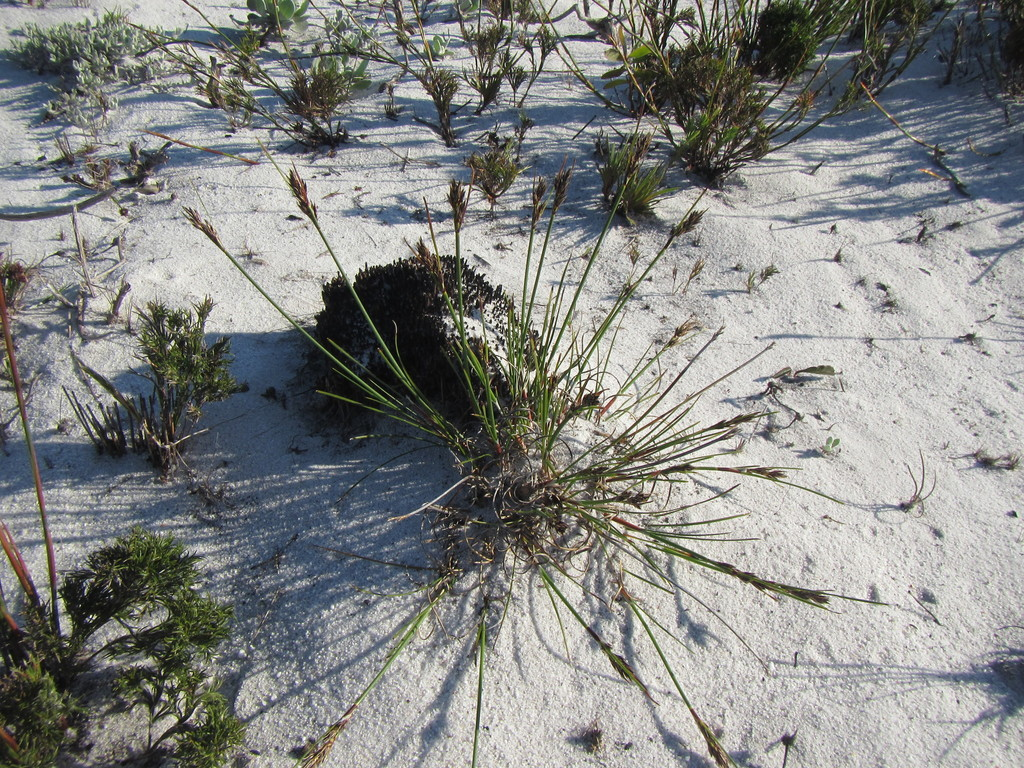
- Fleshy veldrush

Scientific classification
- Kingdom: Plantae
- Clade: Tracheophytes
- Clade: Angiosperms
- Clade: Monocots
- Clade: Commelinids
- Order: Poales
- Family: Cyperaceae
- Genus: Schoenus
- Species: S. auritus

Binomial name
- Schoenus auritus (Nees) T.L.Elliott & Muasya
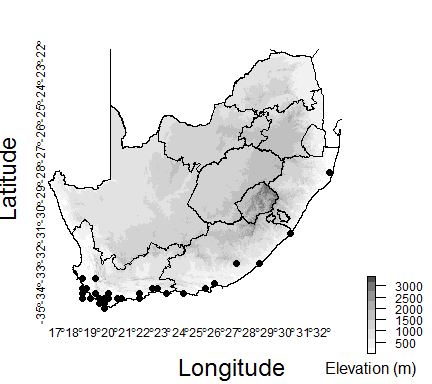
- Documented collection localities in South Africa

Synonyms
- Elynanthus auritus Nees; Tetraria sylvatica f. aurita (Nees) Boeckeler ex Kük; Elynanthus sylvaticus Nees; Schoenus sylvaticus (Nees) Kuntze; Tetraria sylvatica (Nees) C.B.Clarke; Schoenus laticulmis T.L.Elliott & Muasya

= Schoenus auritus =

Species of grass-like plant

Schoenus auritus is a species of sedge endemic to southern and eastern South Africa.

== Description ==
The key diagnostic character of Schoenus auritus is its semi-succulent (or fleshy) growth form. It also has loose, membranaceous leaf sheaths and membranaceous lateral extensions (auricles) on the primary bracts of its flowering heads (i.e. primary inflorescence bracts). This species often displays its anthers for long periods of time.

The semi-succulent growth form of Schoenus crassiculmis partially resembles that of S. auritus, but the former species does not have membranaceous leaf sheaths, and its spikelets are narrower with relatively shorter lower glumes. Schoenus graminifolius and Schoenus purpurascens also have loose, membranaceous leaf sheaths, but these two species lack the semi-succulent growth form of S. auritus.

Similar to other sedges, plants in this group are very difficult to identify. It appears that part of this problem is caused by the tendency of the southern African Schoenus to form hybrids with each other. Schoenus auritus appears to possibly form hybrids, especially with Schoenus cuspidatus.

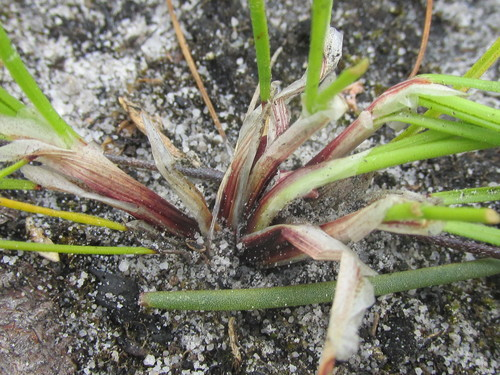
Membranaceous base of plant

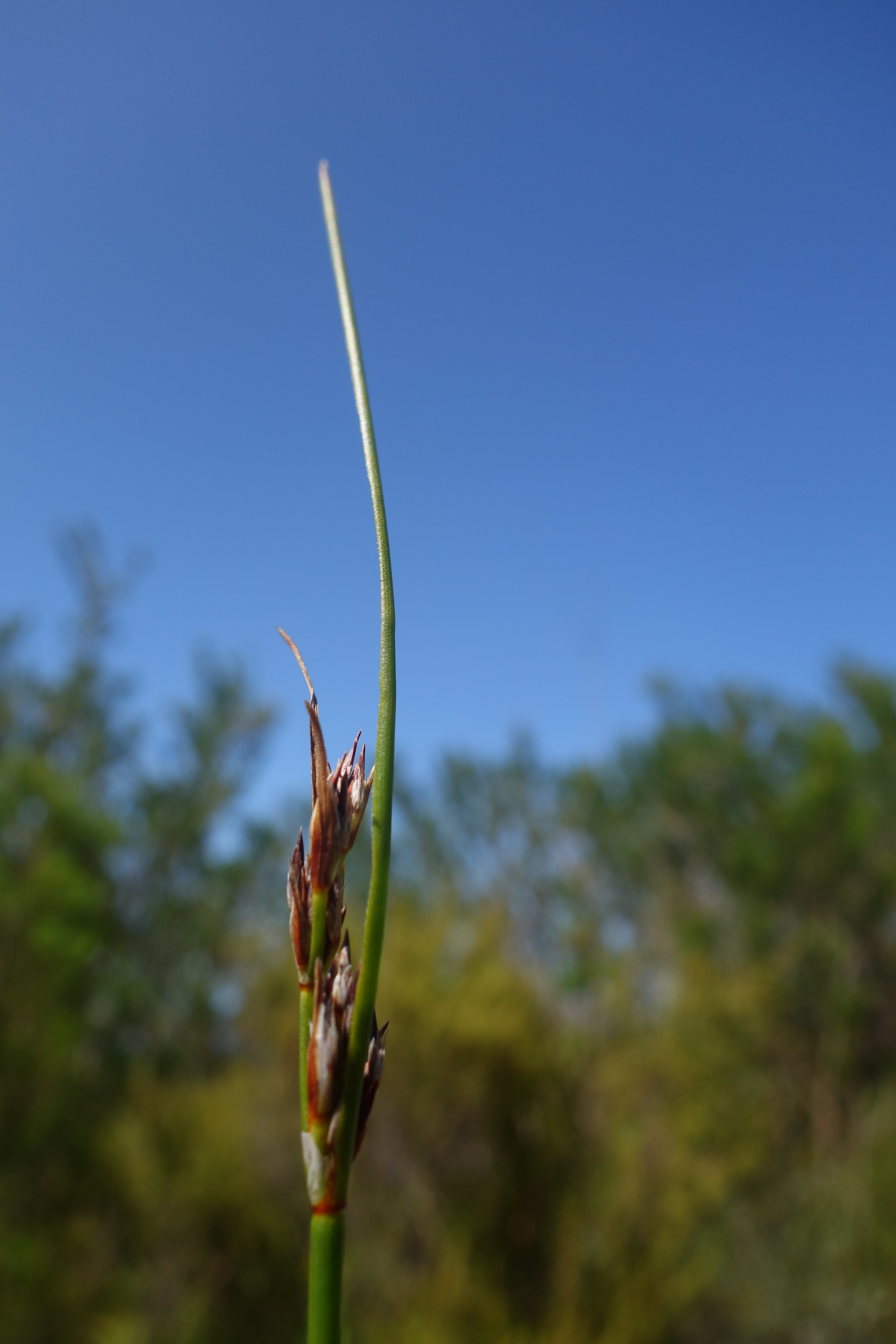
Flowering head

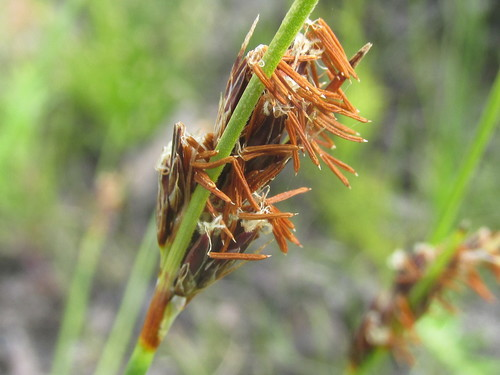
Flowering head showing stigmas and stamens

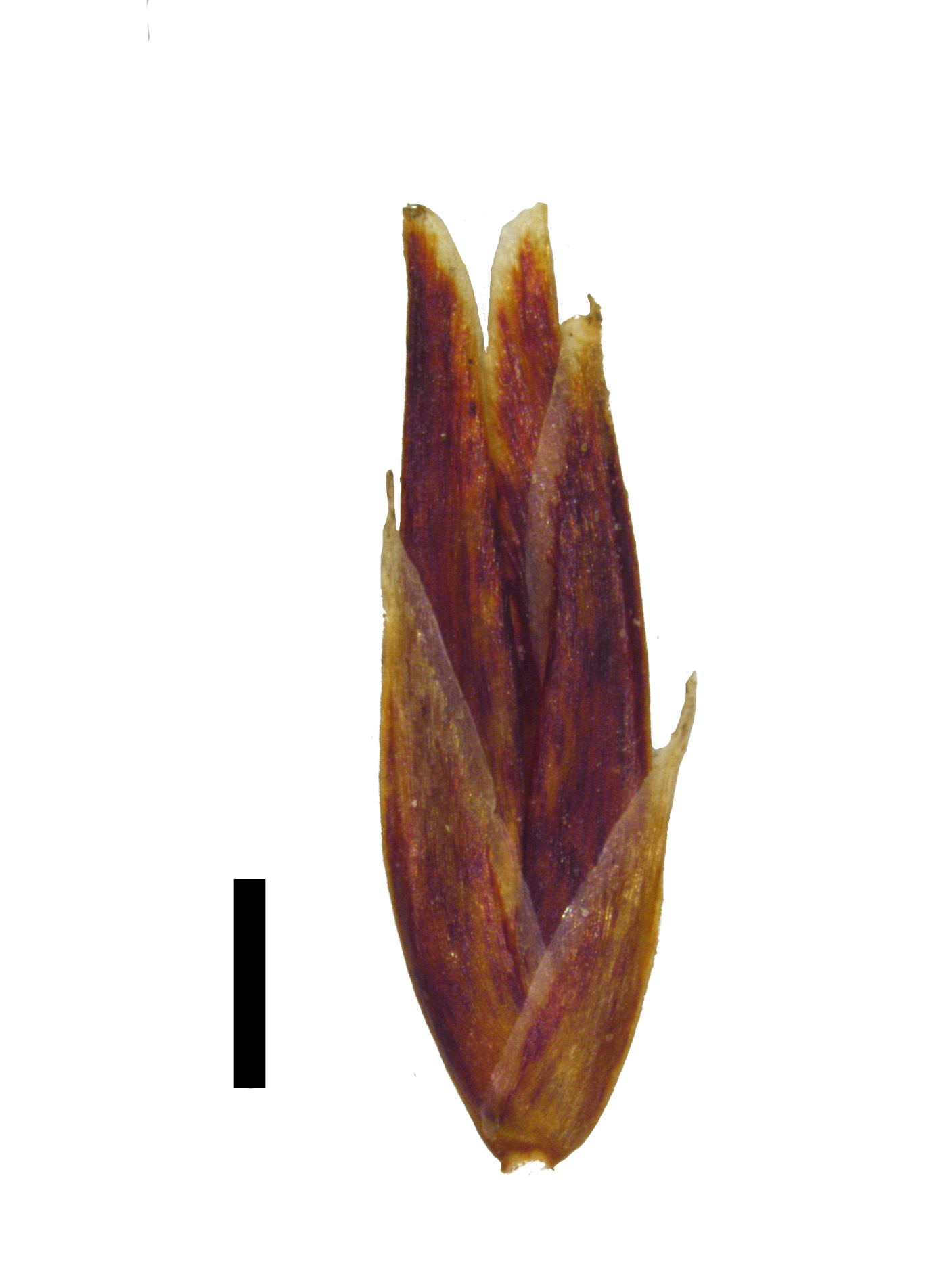
Spikelet

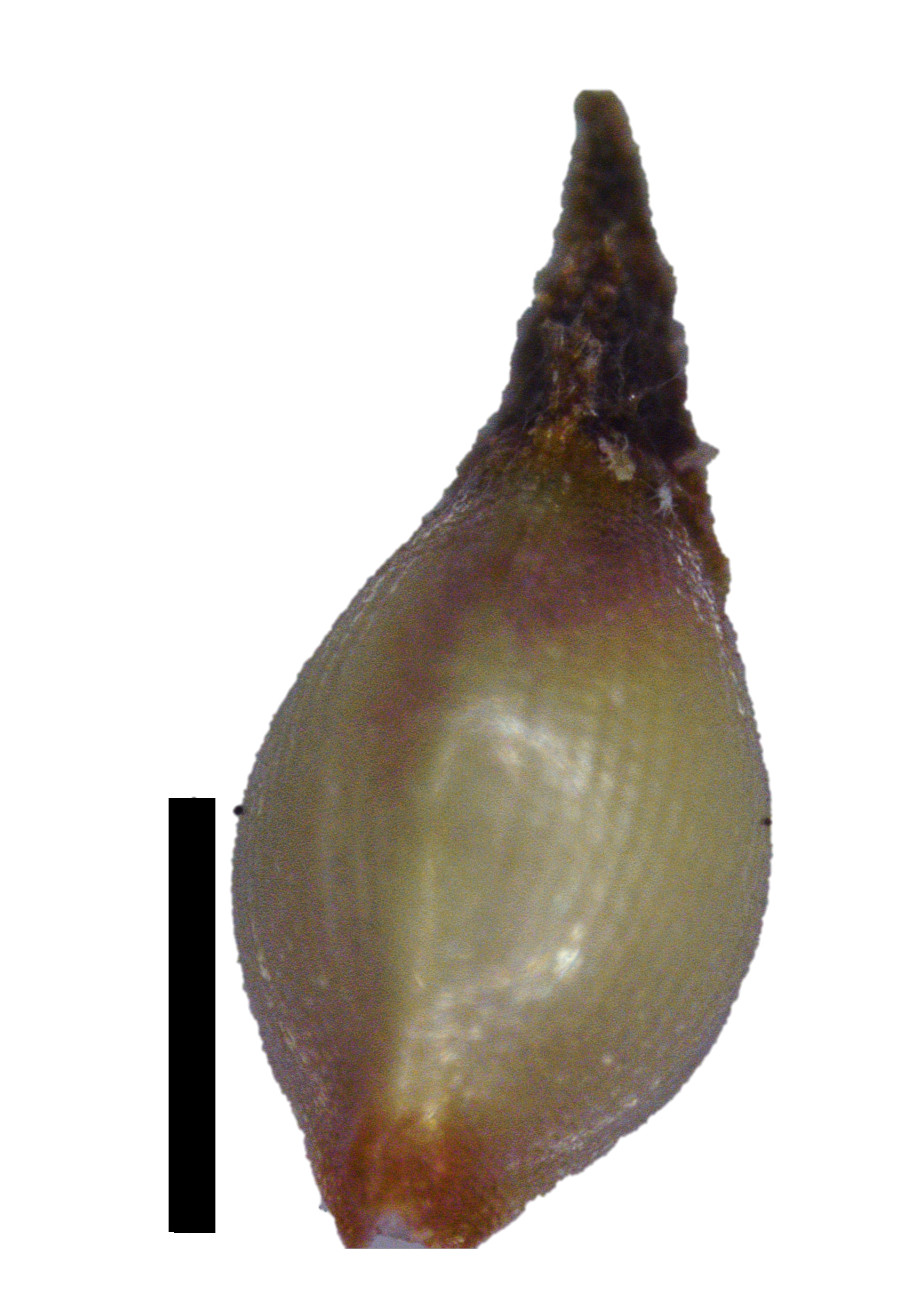
Nutlet

== Taxonomy ==
Schoenus auritus is a species in family Cyperaceae, tribe Schoeneae. Other notable genera in tribe Schoeneae include Lepidosperma, Oreobolus, Costularia, Tetraria and Gahnia. The most closely related species to S. auritus are other southern African Schoenus species, specifically, species in the S. cuspidatus and allies group.

Southern African Schoenus were once classified as Tetraria; however, based on molecular and morphological differences, we now know that the two groups are evolutionary distinct. To ensure that this group of sedges is monophyletic (i.e. the genus only has closely related species), several species of Epischoenus and the southern African Tetraria were transferred into Schoenus. In the field, the southern African Schoenus can be distinguished from Tetraria species by their lack of stem leaves and the absence of reticulate sheaths at the bases of the flowering stems.

== Distribution and habitat ==
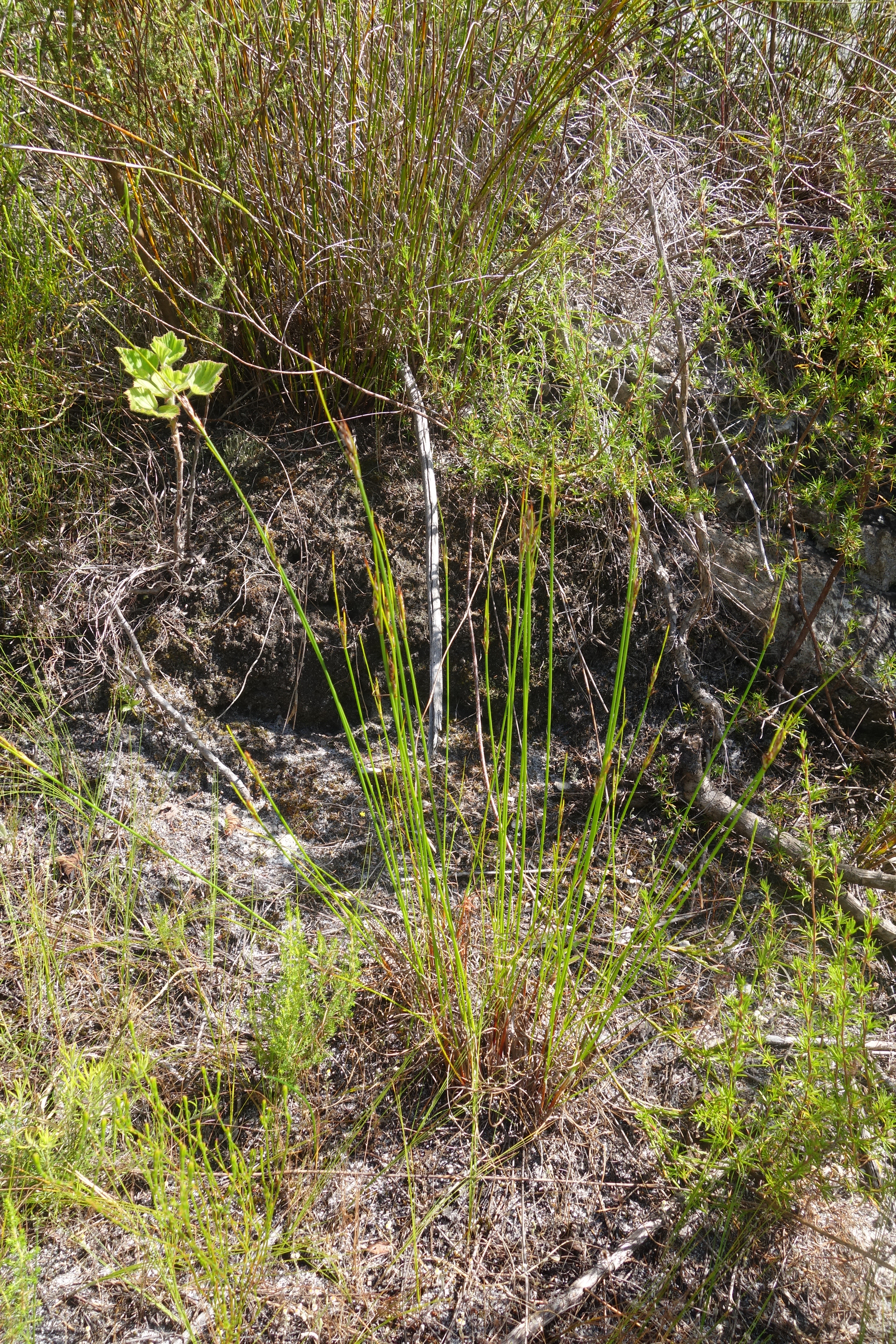
Growth form

Schoenus auritus generally grows without 200 km of the coastline in South Africa, with its distribution ranging from northern parts of the KwaZulu-Natal Province to the Western Cape Province.

Most reports of this species are from coarse soils, but it appears to occasionally occur in wet habitats such as seepages and streamsides.

== Images ==
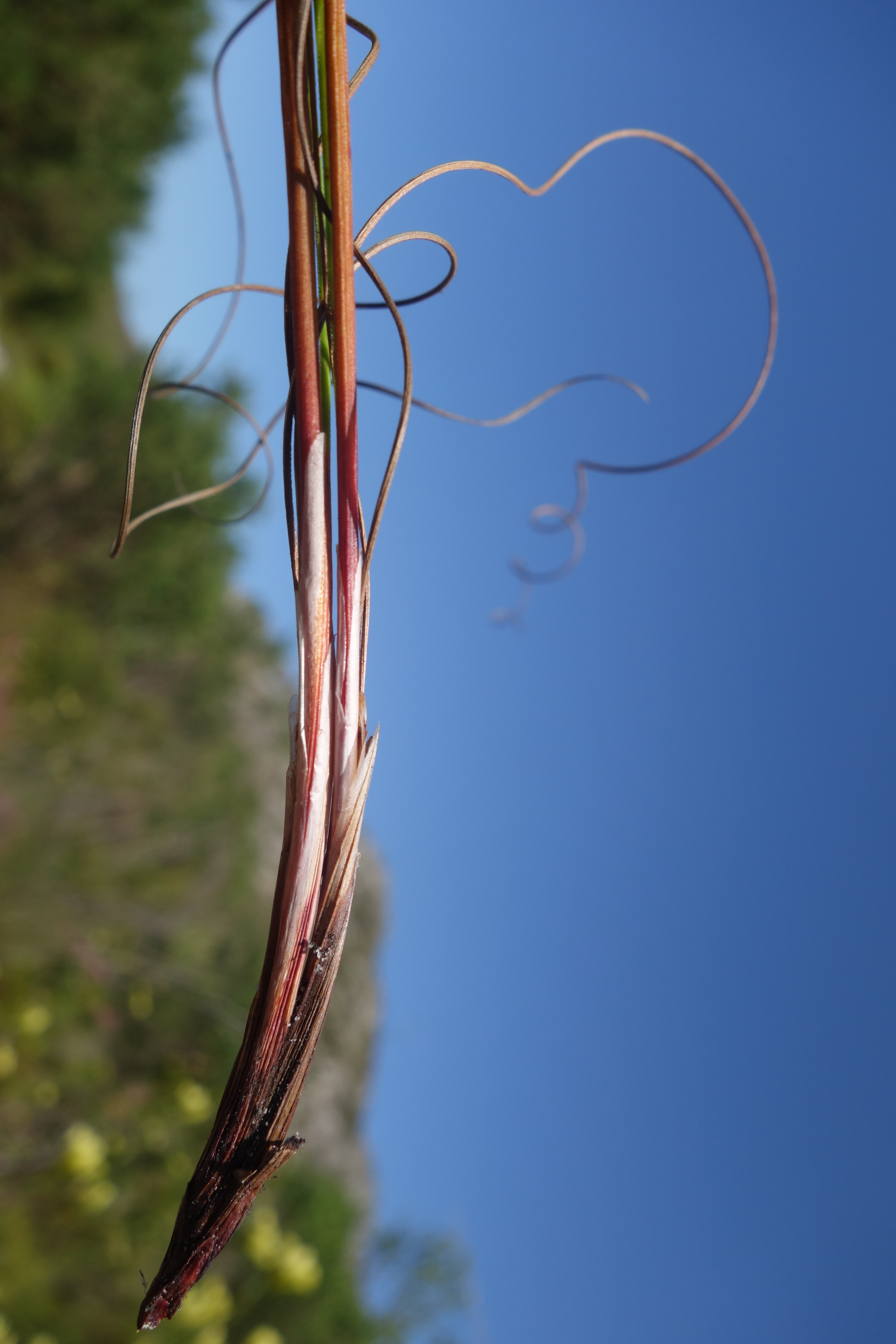
Membranaceous base of plant

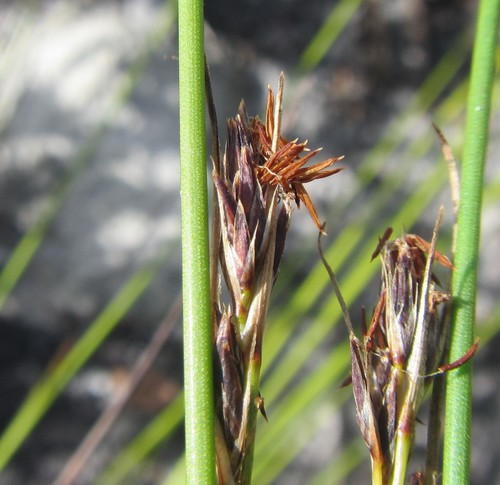
Flowering heads

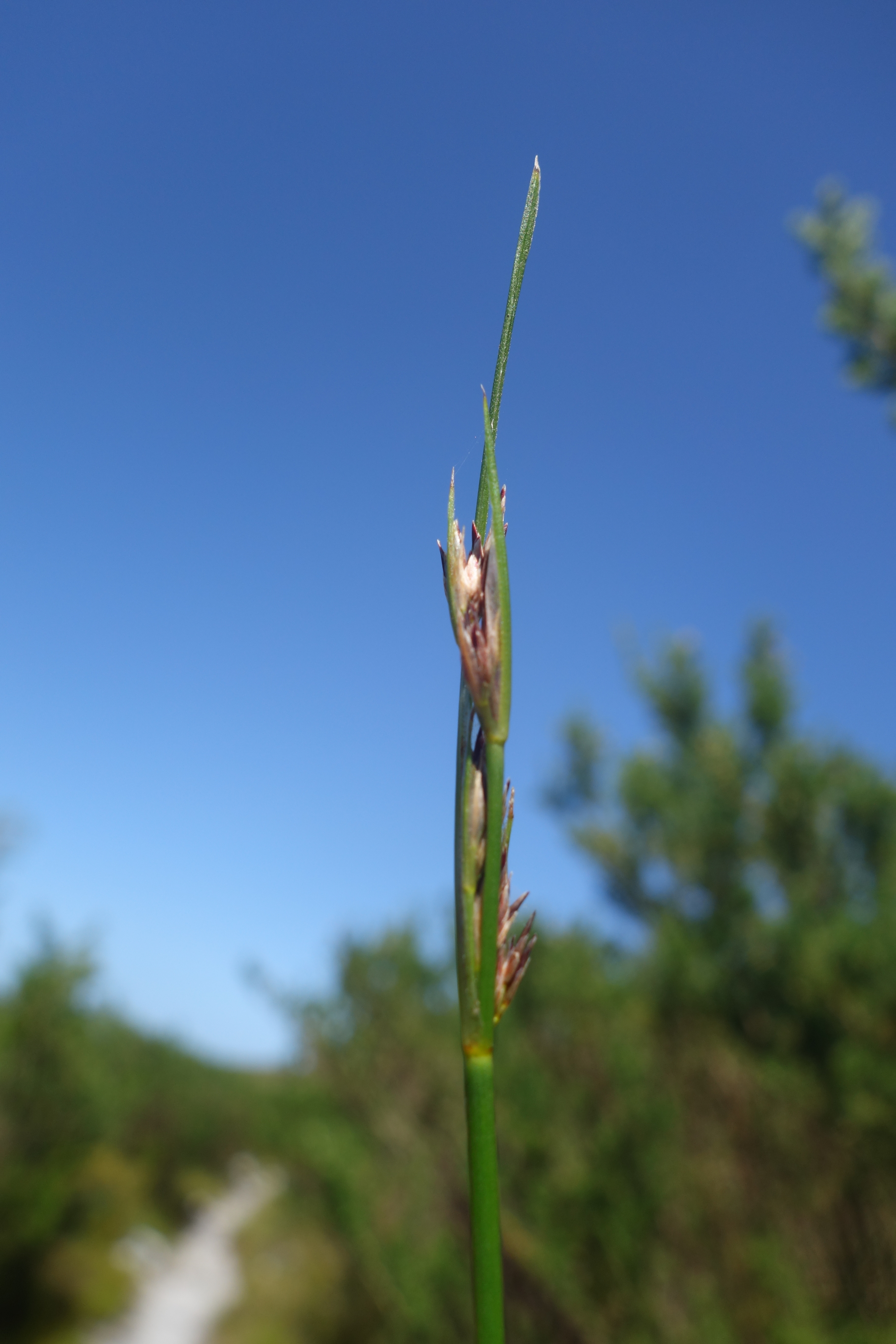
Flowering head
