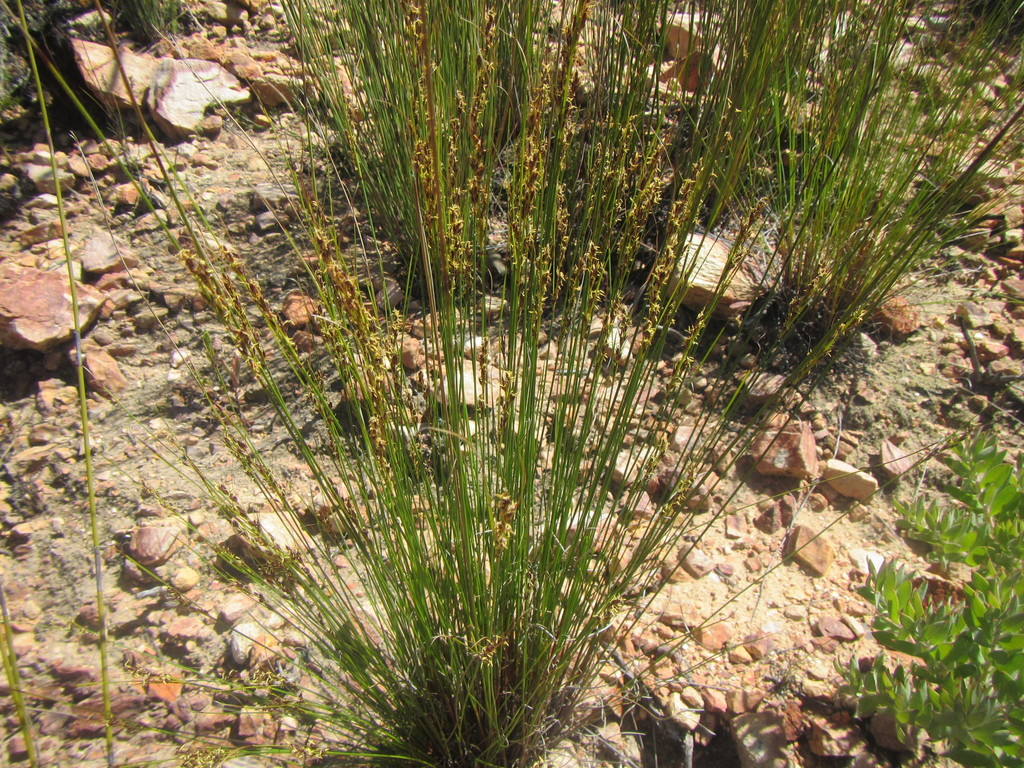
- Marginal veldrush

Scientific classification
- Kingdom: Plantae
- Clade: Tracheophytes
- Clade: Angiosperms
- Clade: Monocots
- Clade: Commelinids
- Order: Poales
- Family: Cyperaceae
- Genus: Schoenus
- Species: S. submarginalis

Binomial name
- Schoenus submarginalis T.L.Elliott & Muasya
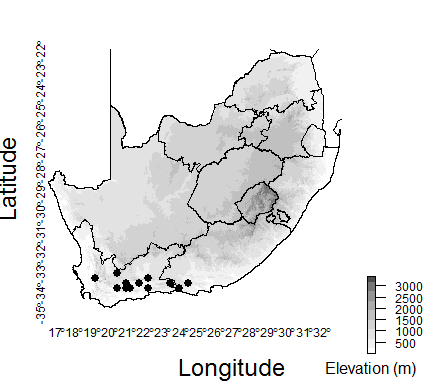
- Documented collection localities

= Schoenus submarginalis =

Species of grass-like plant

Schoenus submarginalis is a species of sedge endemic to the mountains of the Western and Eastern Cape provinces of South Africa.

== Description ==
The key diagnostic character of S. submarginalis are its relatively narrow (<1.2 mm) and short (<4.2 mm) spikelets. In addition, S. submarginalis has small reddish-purple streaks adjacent to its glume margins.

Schoenus exilis, Schoenus ligulatus and Schoenus quartziticus also have narrow spikelets, but these species do not hyaline glume margins with adjacent reddish-purple streaks. In addition, these three species tend to have either linear-lanceolate or narrow lanceolate spikelets, compared to the wider spikelets of S. submarginalis.

Schoenus submarginalis is most similar to Schoenus bolusii, but the two species differ in their leaf sheaths. The sheaths of S. submarginalis are firm, whereas those of S. bolusii are membranaceous with reddish-purple-streaking patterns. Schoenus submarginalis tends to be a slightly taller plant (305-475 mm) compared to S. bolusii (249-310 mm).

Similar to other sedges, plants in this group are very difficult to identify. It appears that part of this problem is caused by the tendency of the southern African Schoenus to form hybrids with each other. It is not clear whether Schoenus submarginalis forms hybrids with other southern African Schoenus species.

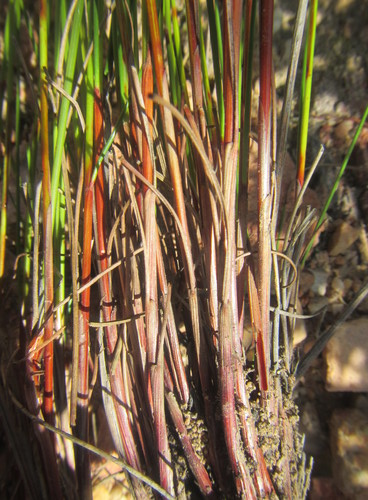
Bases of flowering stems (culms)

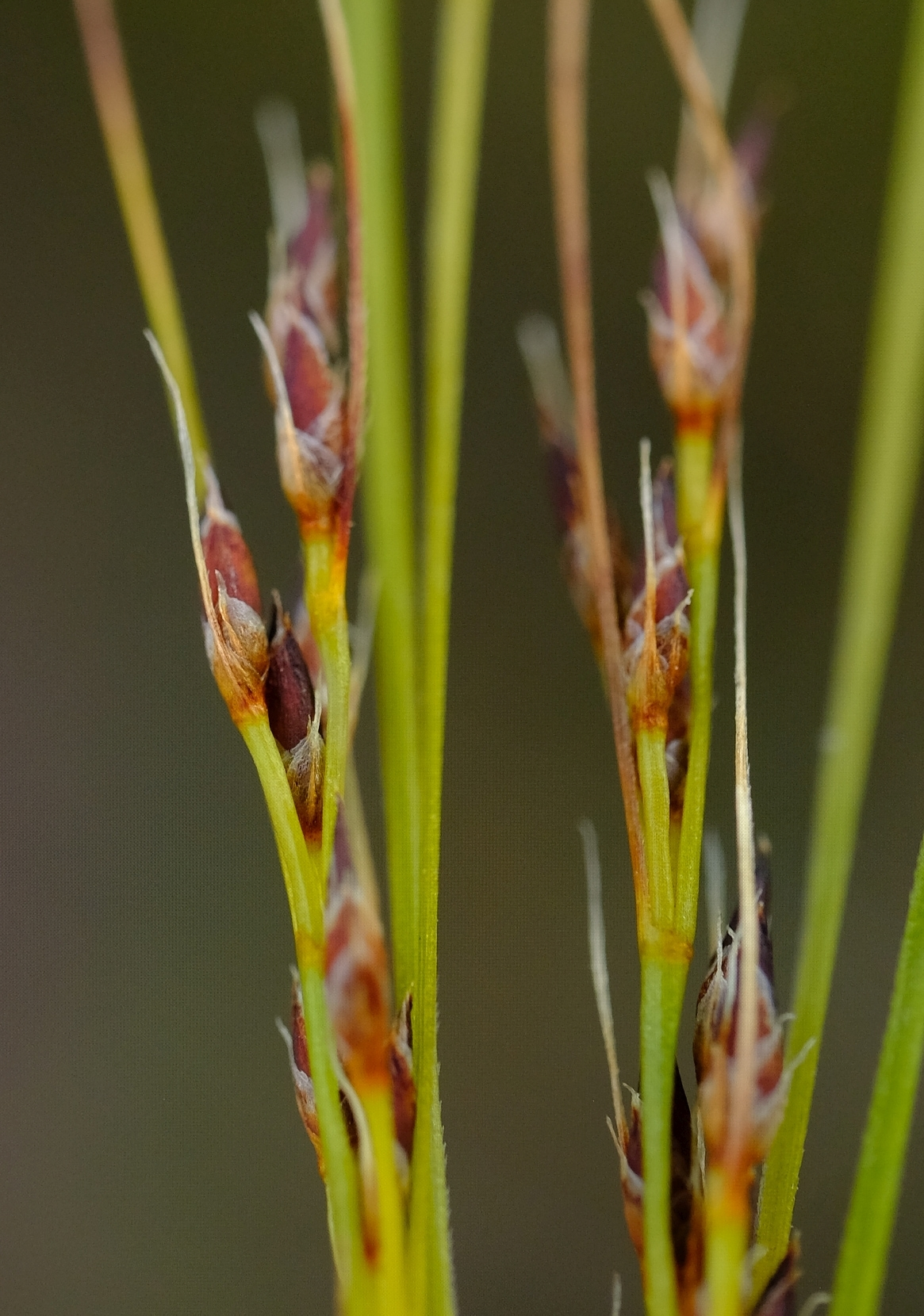
Flowering heads (inflorescences)

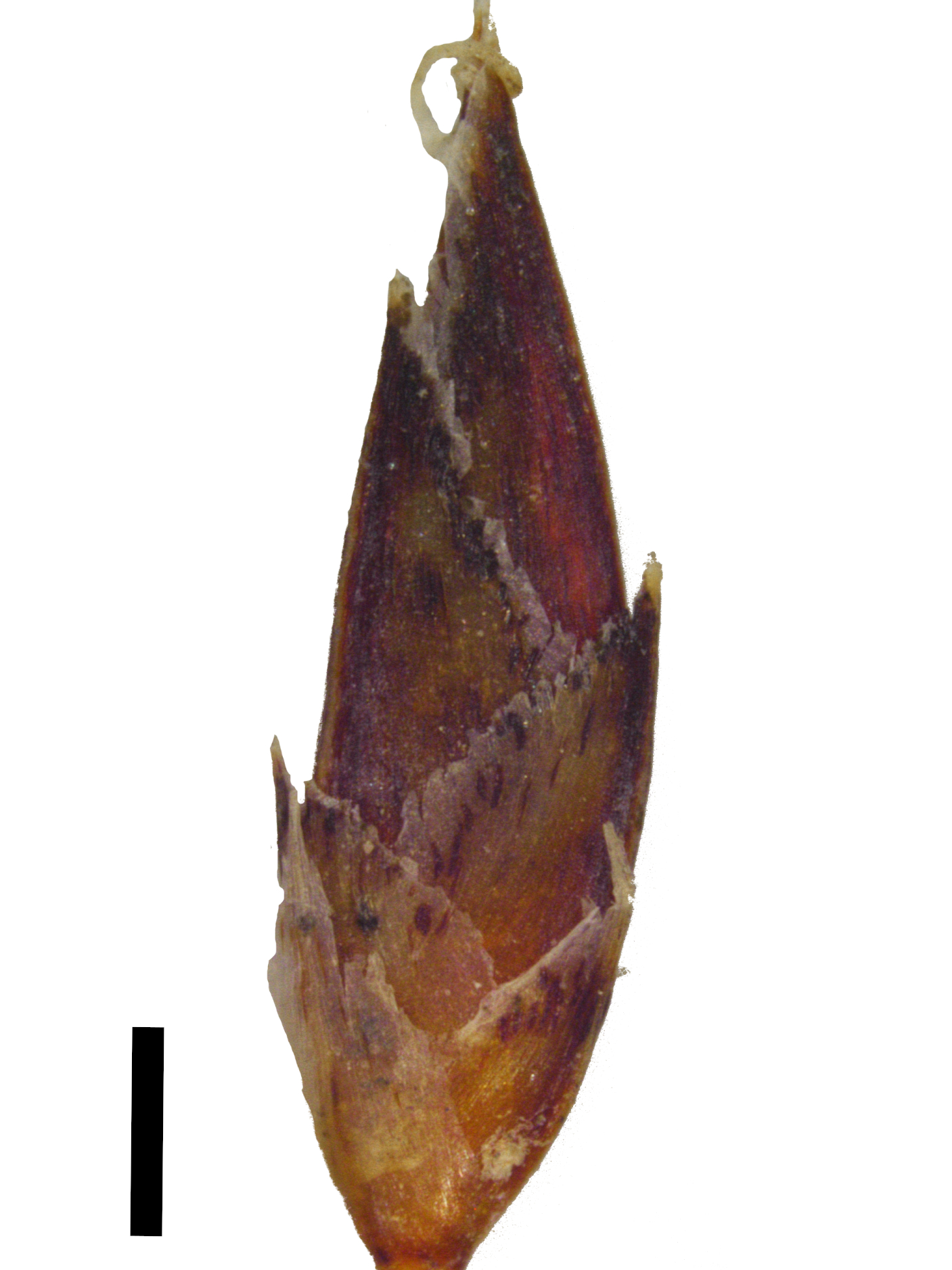
Spikelet (black scale bar represents 1 mm)

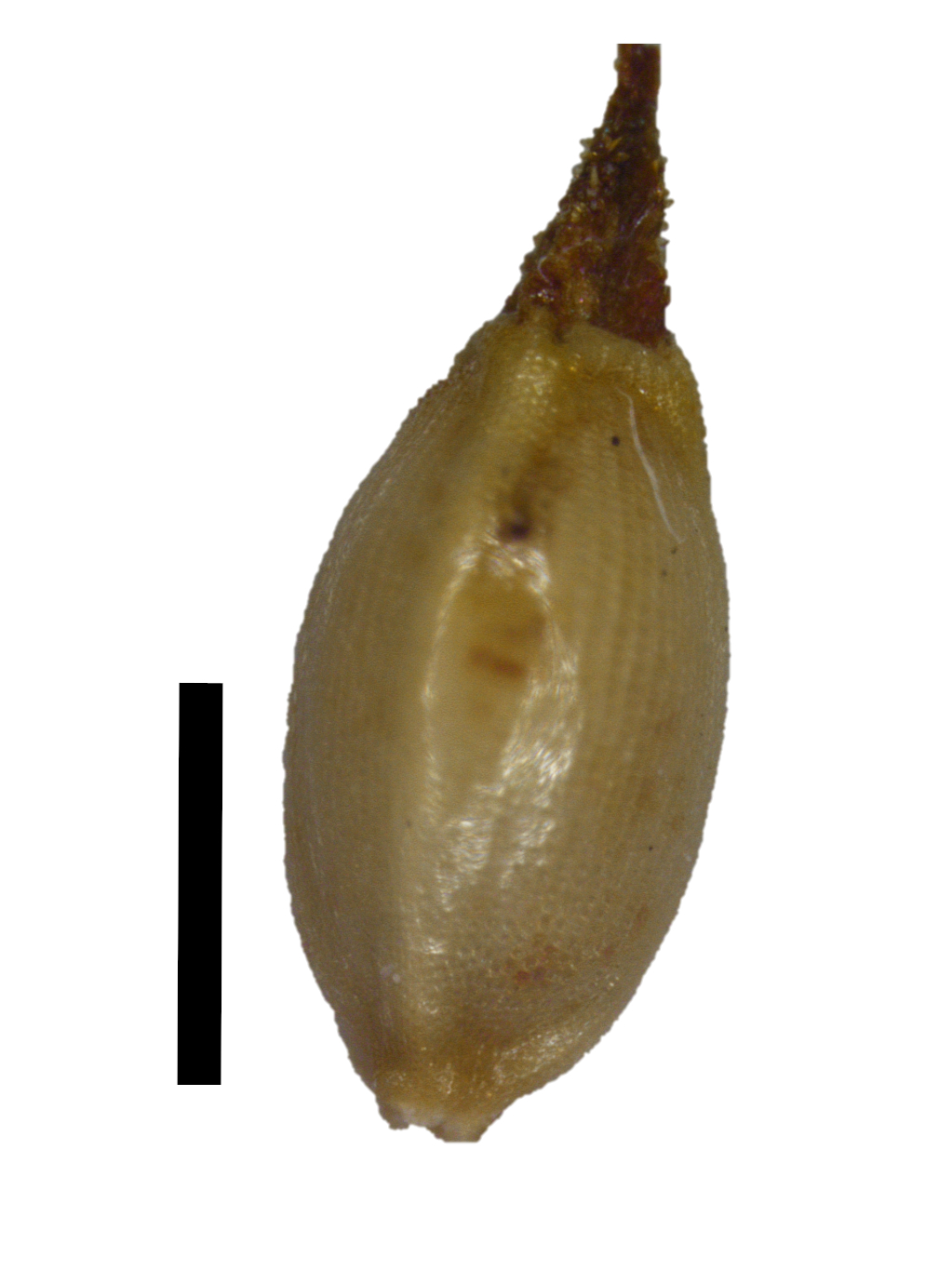
Nutlet (black scale bar represents 1 mm)

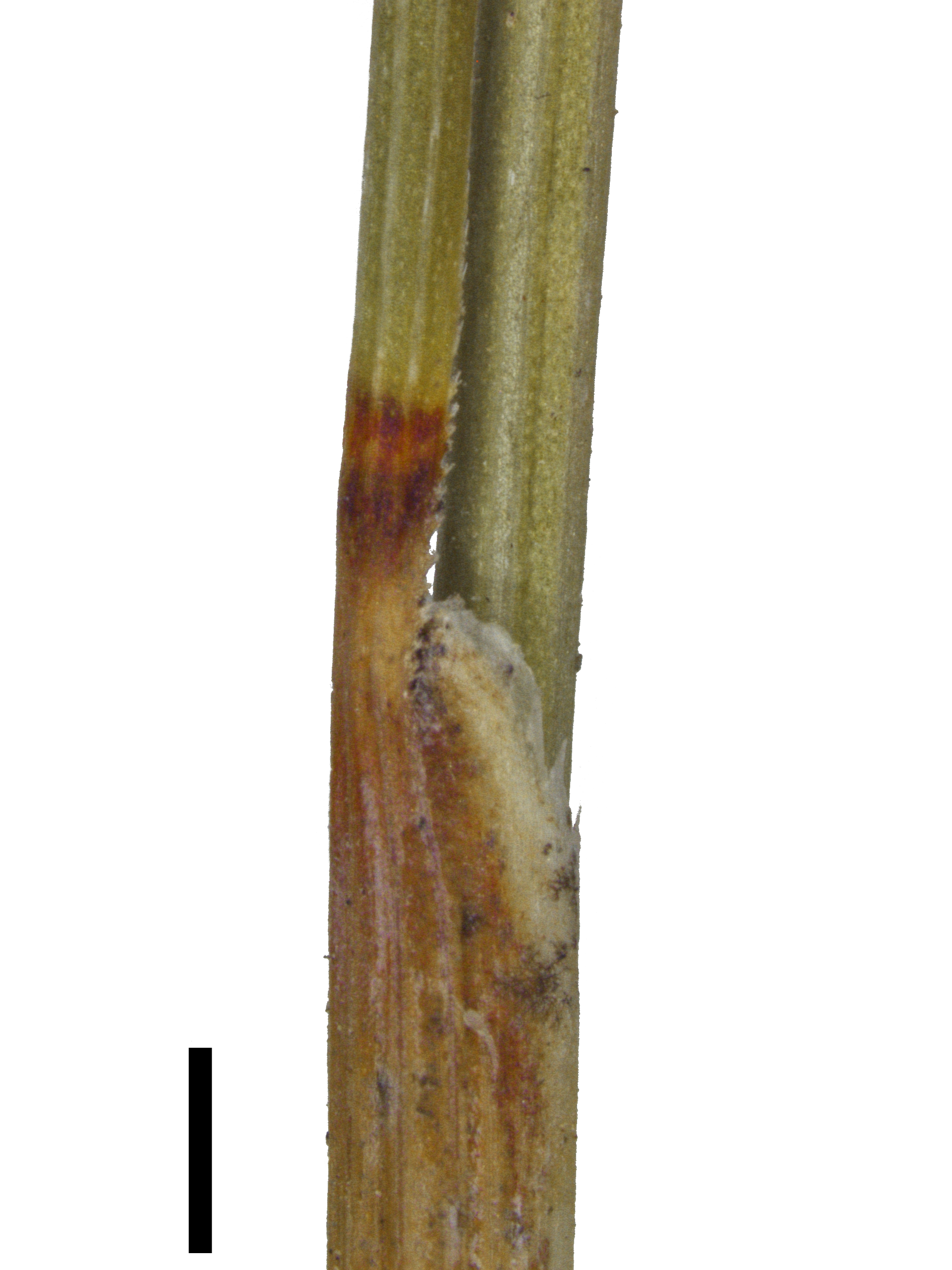
Ligule of Schoenus submarginalis (black scale bar represents 1 mm)

== Taxonomy ==
Schoenus submarginalis is a species in family Cyperaceae, tribe Schoeneae. Other notable genera in tribe Schoeneae include Lepidosperma, Oreobolus, Costularia, Tetraria and Gahnia. The most closely related species to S. submarginalis are other southern African Schoenus species, specifically, species in the S. cuspidatus and allies group.

Southern African Schoenus were once classified as Tetraria; however, based on molecular and morphological differences, we now know that the two groups are evolutionary distinct. To ensure that this group of sedges is monophyletic (i.e. the genus only has closely related species), several species of Epischoenus and the southern African Tetraria were transferred into Schoenus. In the field, the southern African Schoenus can be distinguished from Tetraria species by their lack of stem leaves and the absence of reticulate sheaths at the bases of the flowering stems.

== Distribution and habitat ==
Schoenus submarginalis is a species of sedge found in mountainous regions of the Western Cape and Eastern Cape Provinces of South Africa. Its distribution ranges from Aynsberg in the west to the Baviaanskloof area in the east, growing at elevations over 600 m on coarse substrates.

== Images ==
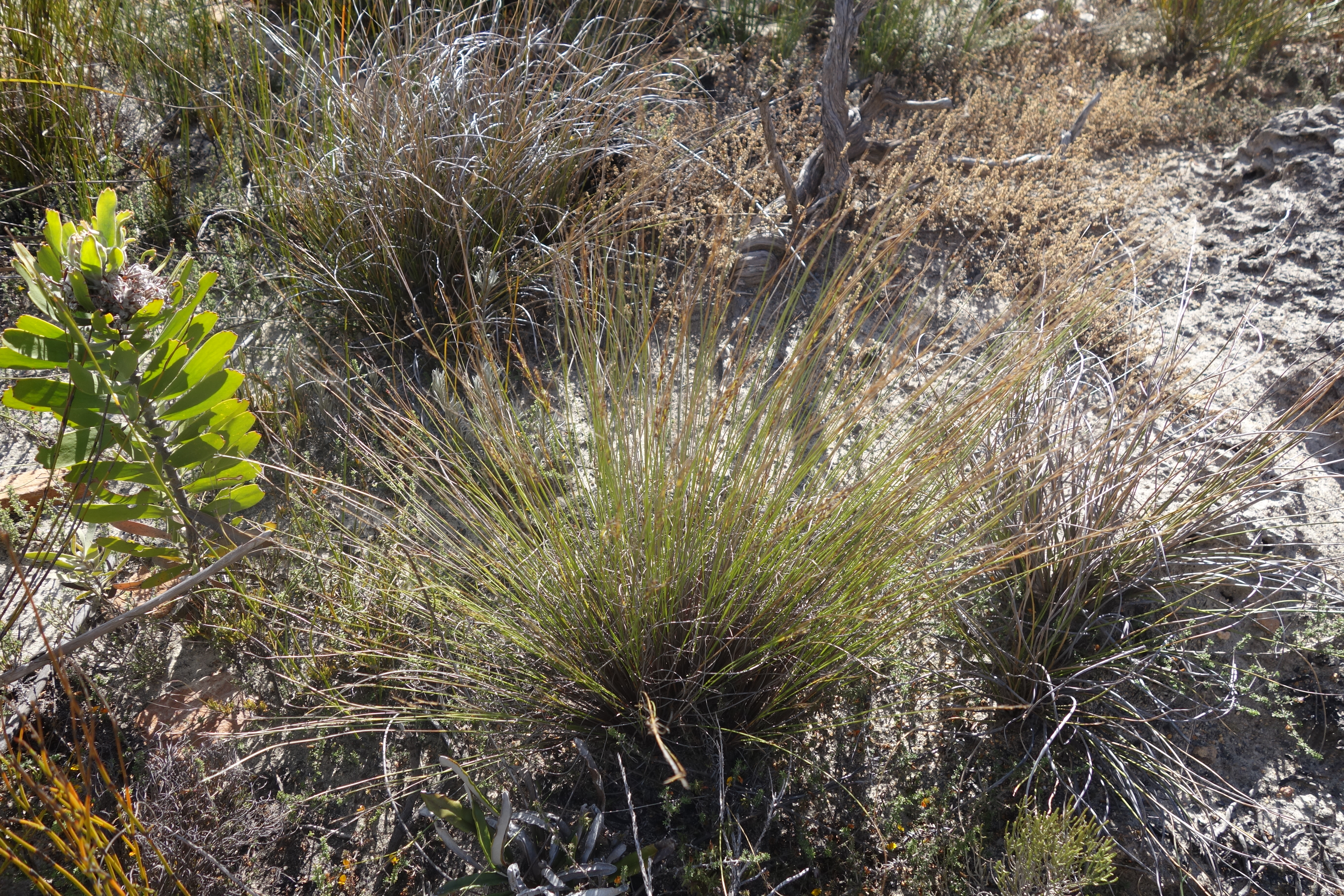
Growth form

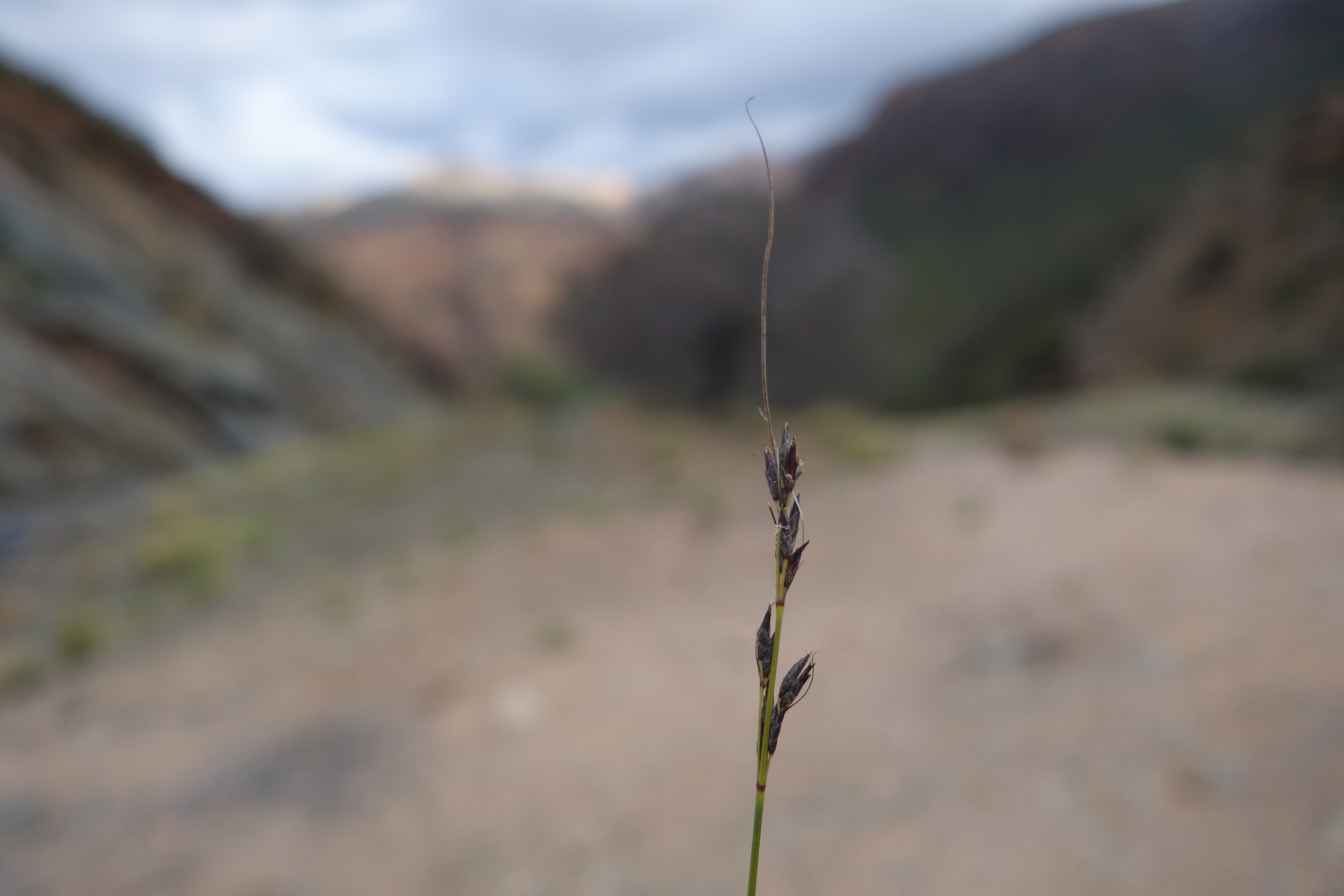
Flowering head (inflorescence)

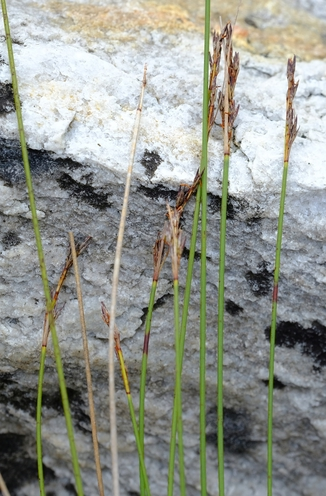
Flowering heads

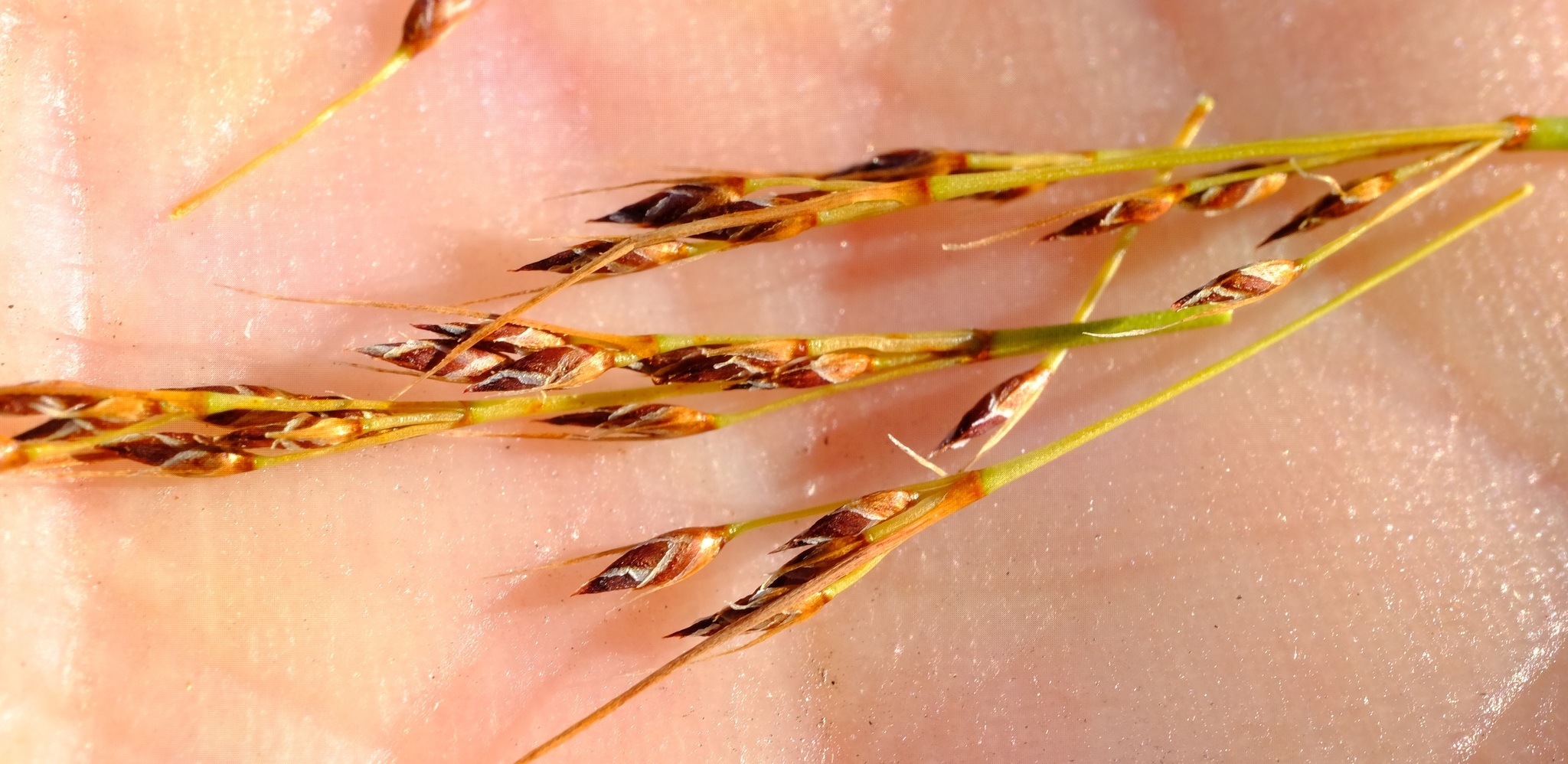
Flowering heads

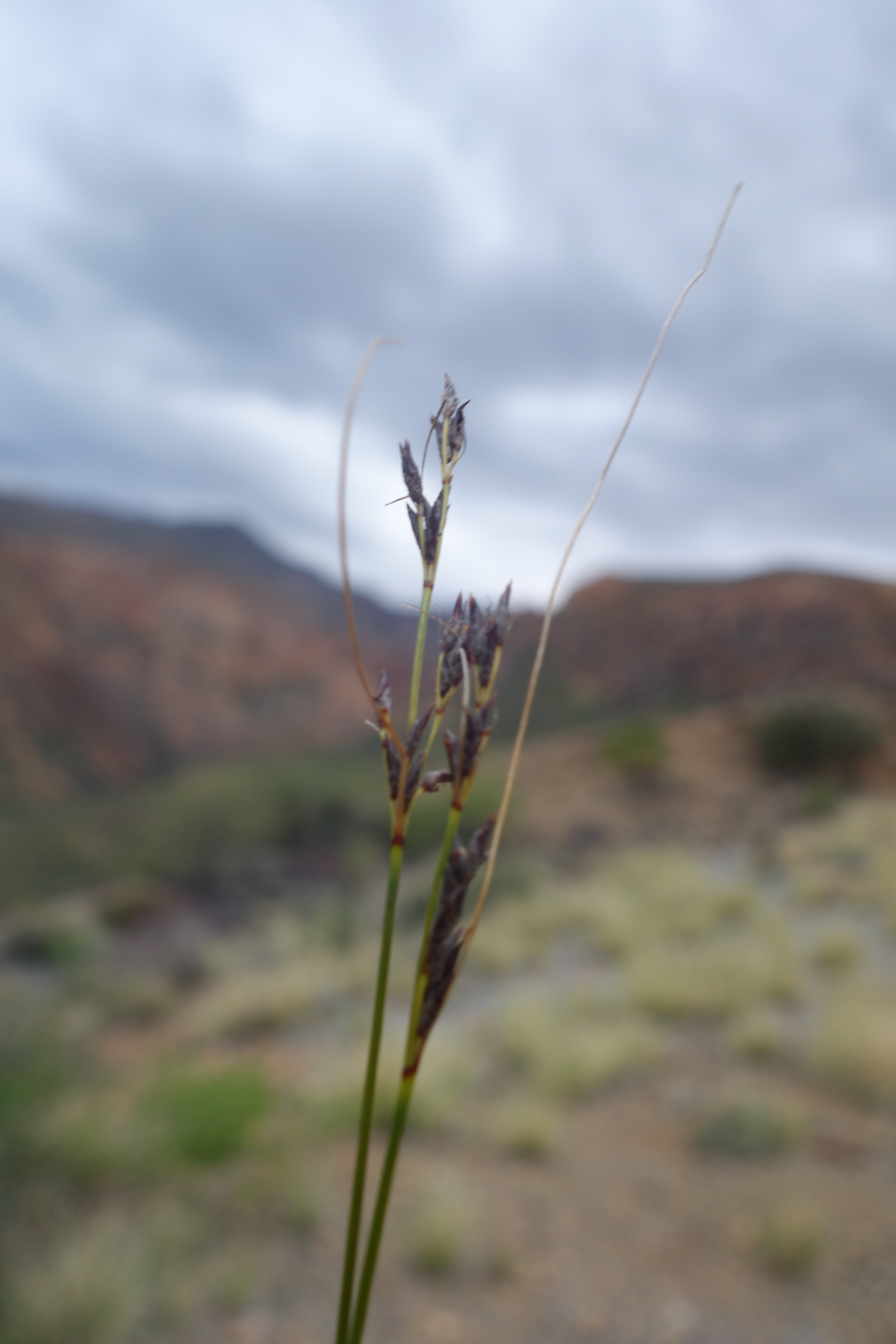
Flowering heads
