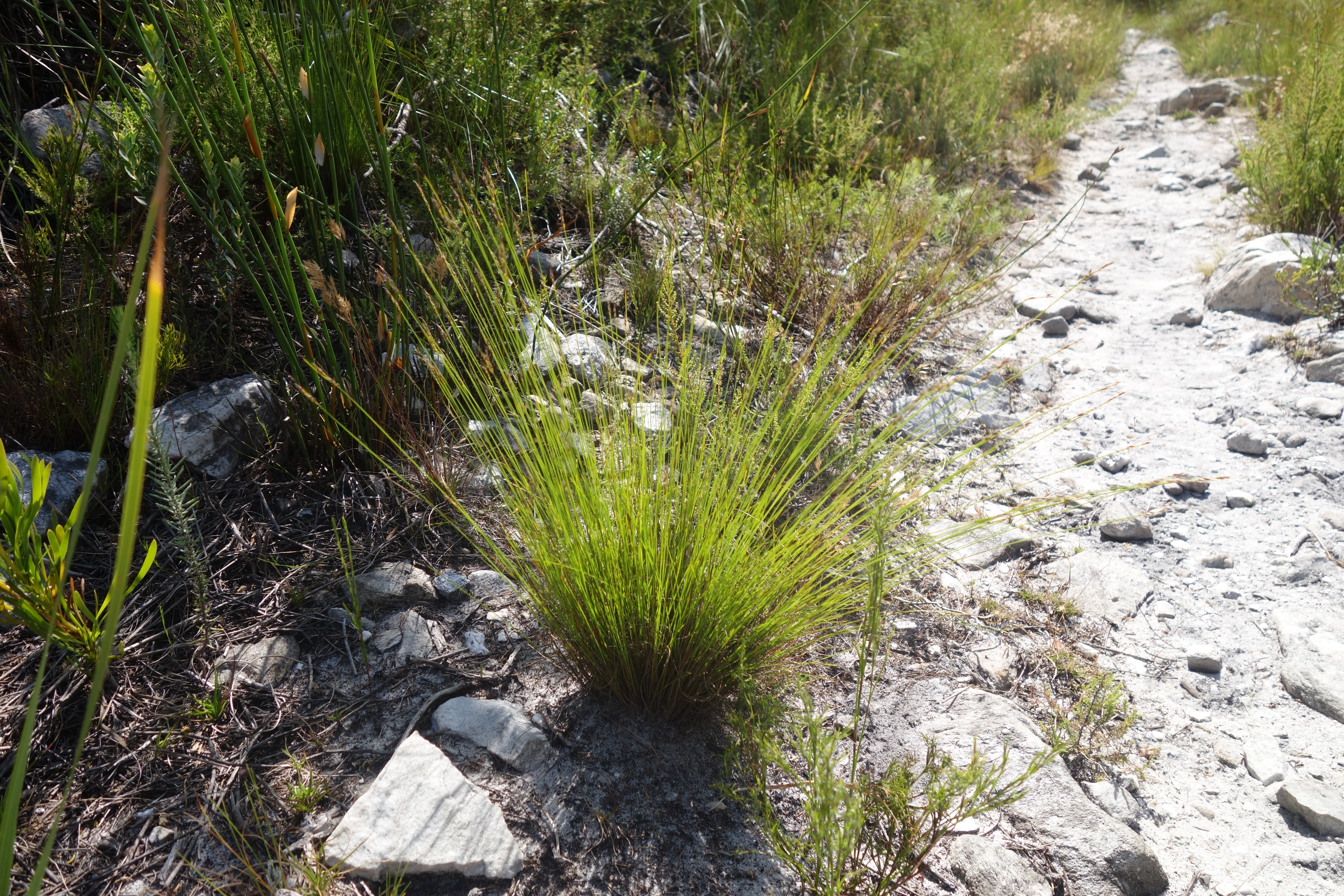
- Spotted veldrush

Scientific classification
- Kingdom: Plantae
- Clade: Tracheophytes
- Clade: Angiosperms
- Clade: Monocots
- Clade: Commelinids
- Order: Poales
- Family: Cyperaceae
- Genus: Schoenus
- Species: S. bolusii

Binomial name
- Schoenus bolusii (C.B.Clarke) T.L.Elliott & Muasya
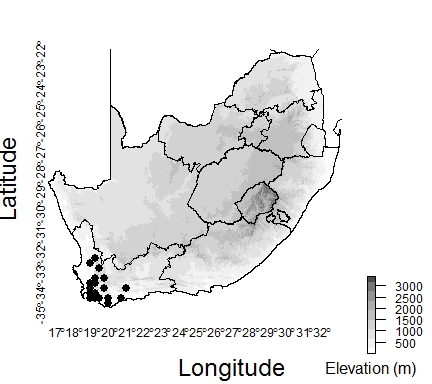
- Documented collection localities

Synonyms
- Tetraria bolusii C.B.Clarke

= Schoenus bolusii =

Species of grass-like plant

Schoenus bolusii is a species of sedge endemic to the mountains of the Western Cape Province of South Africa. However, S. bolusii is not found on the Cape Peninsula.

== Description ==
The key diagnostic character of S. bolusii are its relatively narrow (<1.2 mm) and short (<4.0 mm) spikelets. In addition, S. bolusii has small reddish-purple streaks adjacent to its glume margins and similar streaking patterns on its membranaceous leaf sheaths.

Schoenus exilis, Schoenus ligulatus and Schoenus quartziticus resemble S. bolusii, but these three species do not have the reddish-purple streaking patterns that are characteristic of the glumes and leaf sheaths of S. bolusii.

Schoenus submarginalis is most similar to S. bolusii, but the two species differ in their leaf sheaths, with those of S. submarginalis being firm, whereas the sheaths of S. bolusii are membranaceous with reddish-purple-streaking patterns.

Similar to other sedges, plants in this group are very difficult to identify. It appears that part of this problem is caused by the tendency of the southern African Schoenus to form hybrids with each other. It is not clear whether Schoenus bolusii forms hybrids with other southern African Schoenus species.

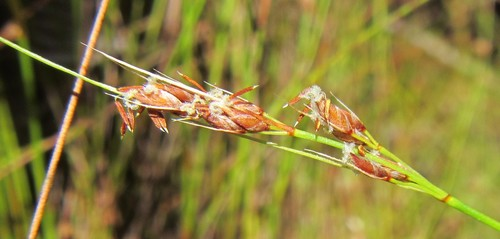
Flowering head with anthers and stigmas

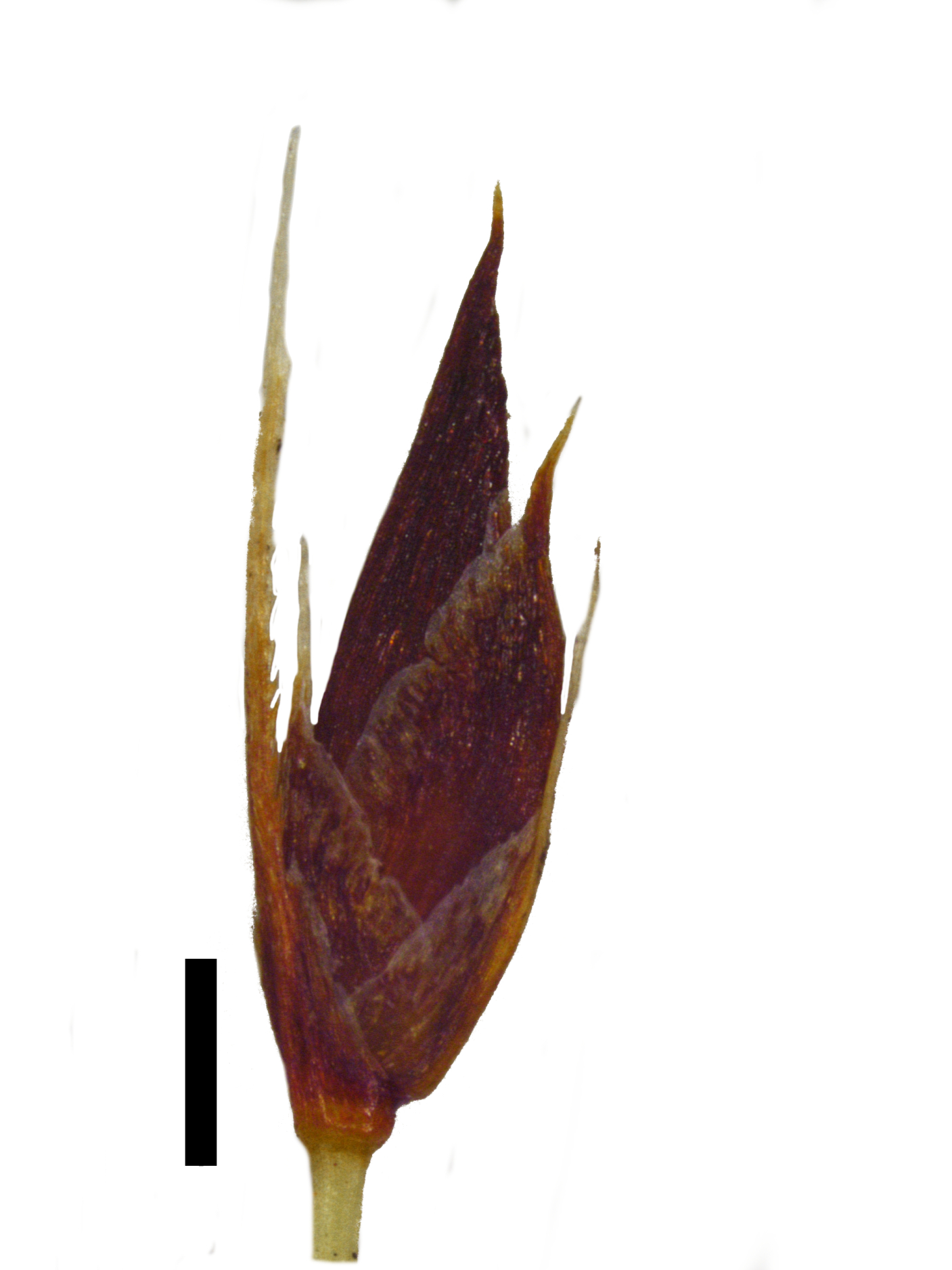
Spikelet (black scale bar represents 1 mm)

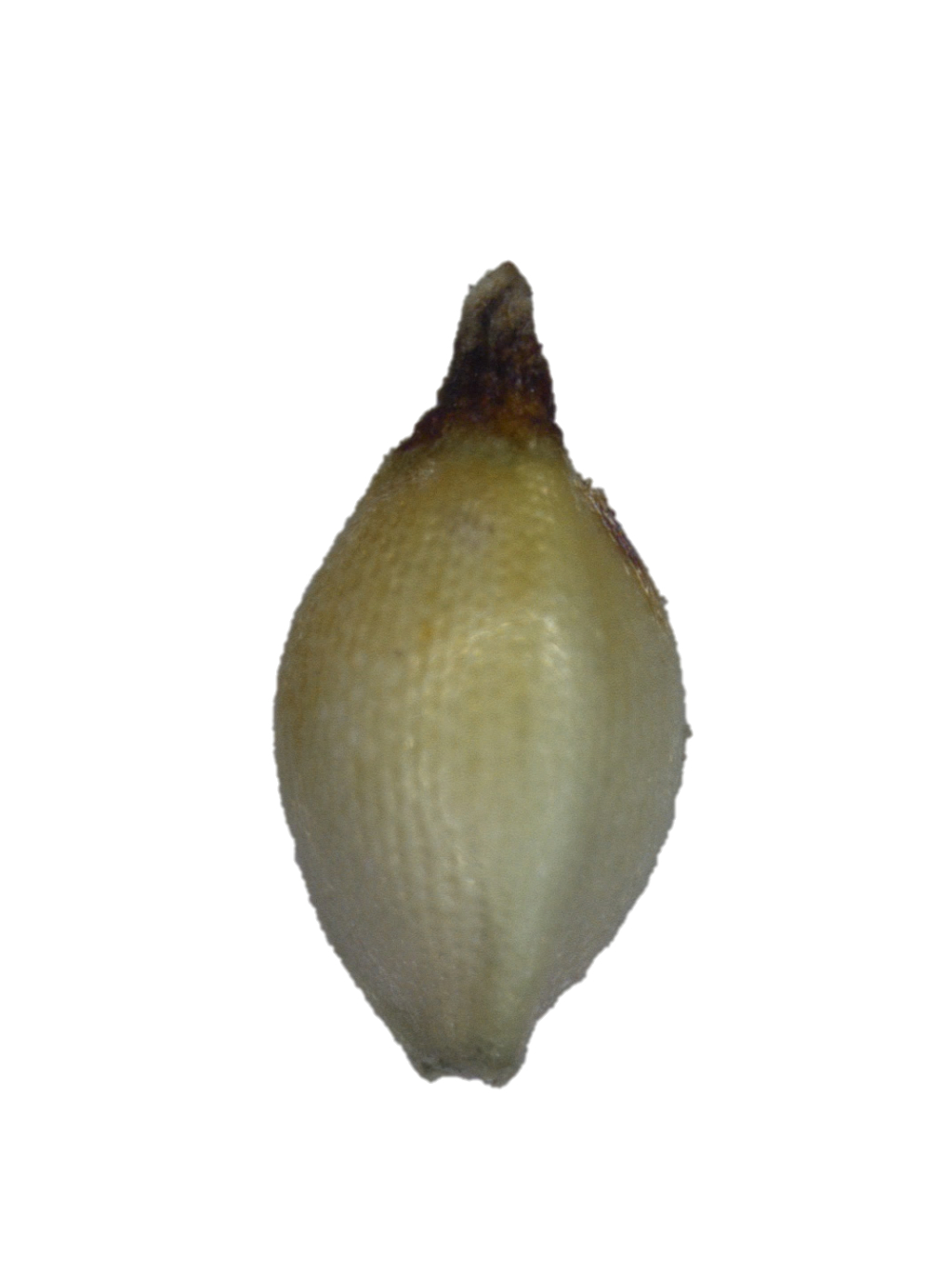
Nutlet

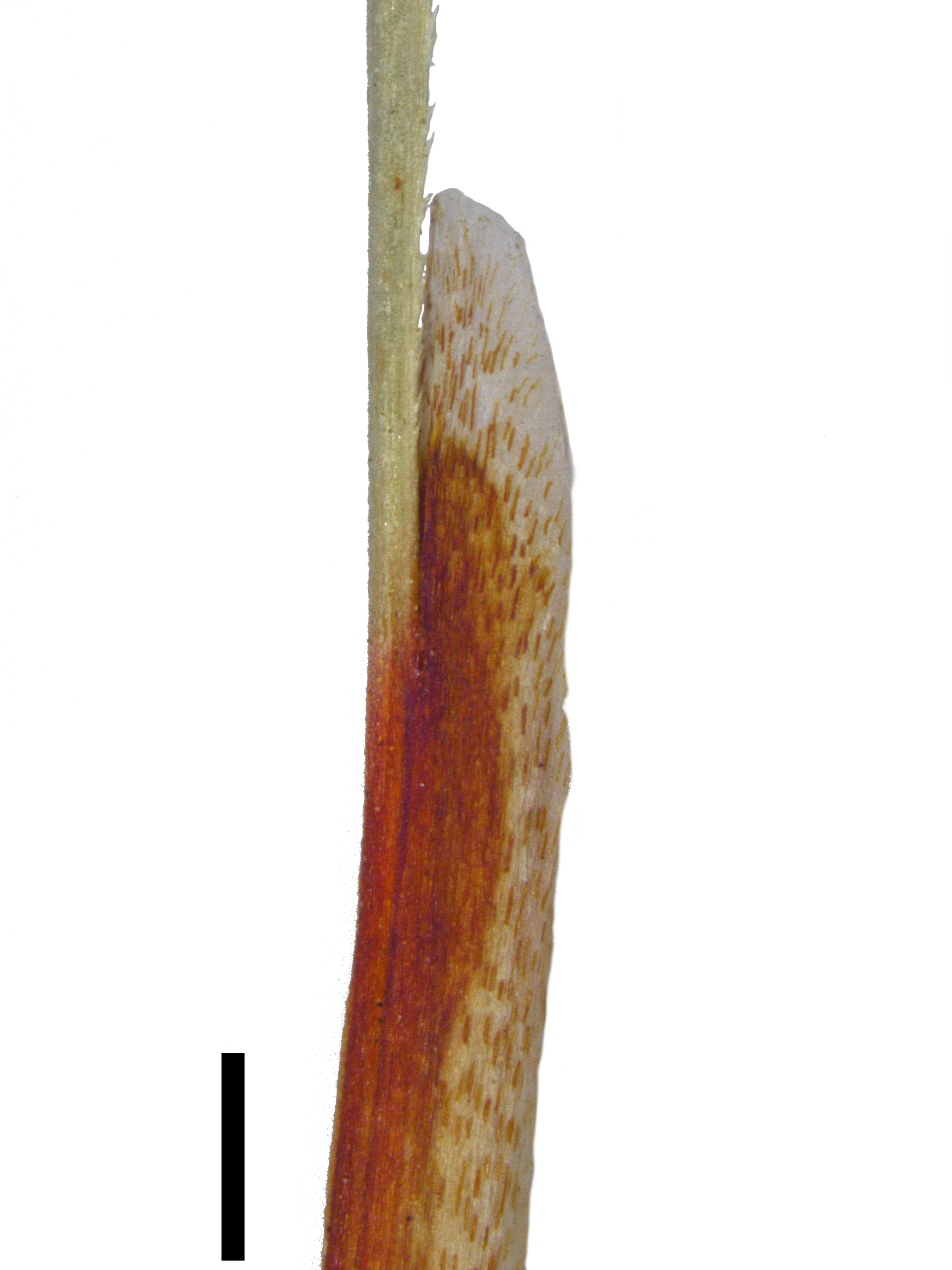
Ligule of Schoenus bolusii (black scale bar represents 1 mm)

== Taxonomy ==
Schoenus bolusii is a species in family Cyperaceae, tribe Schoeneae. Other notable genera in tribe Schoeneae include Lepidosperma, Oreobolus, Costularia, Tetraria and Gahnia. The most closely related species to S. bolusii are other southern African Schoenus species, specifically, species in the S. cuspidatus and allies group.

Southern African Schoenus were once classified as Tetraria; however, based on molecular and morphological differences, we now know that the two groups are evolutionary distinct. To ensure that this group of sedges is monophyletic (i.e. the genus only has closely related species), several species of Epischoenus and the southern African Tetraria were transferred into Schoenus. In the field, the southern African Schoenus can be distinguished from Tetraria species by their lack of stem leaves and the absence of reticulate sheaths at the bases of the flowering stems.

== Distribution and habitat ==
Schoenus bolusii is a species of sedge found in the mountains of the Western Cape Province of South Africa. However, this species is not found on the Cape Peninsula. This species generally occurs on dry sites on coarse soils, but it has been also collected from wet mountain slopes. The reported elevation range of S. bolusii is between sea level and nearly 1000 m.

== Images ==
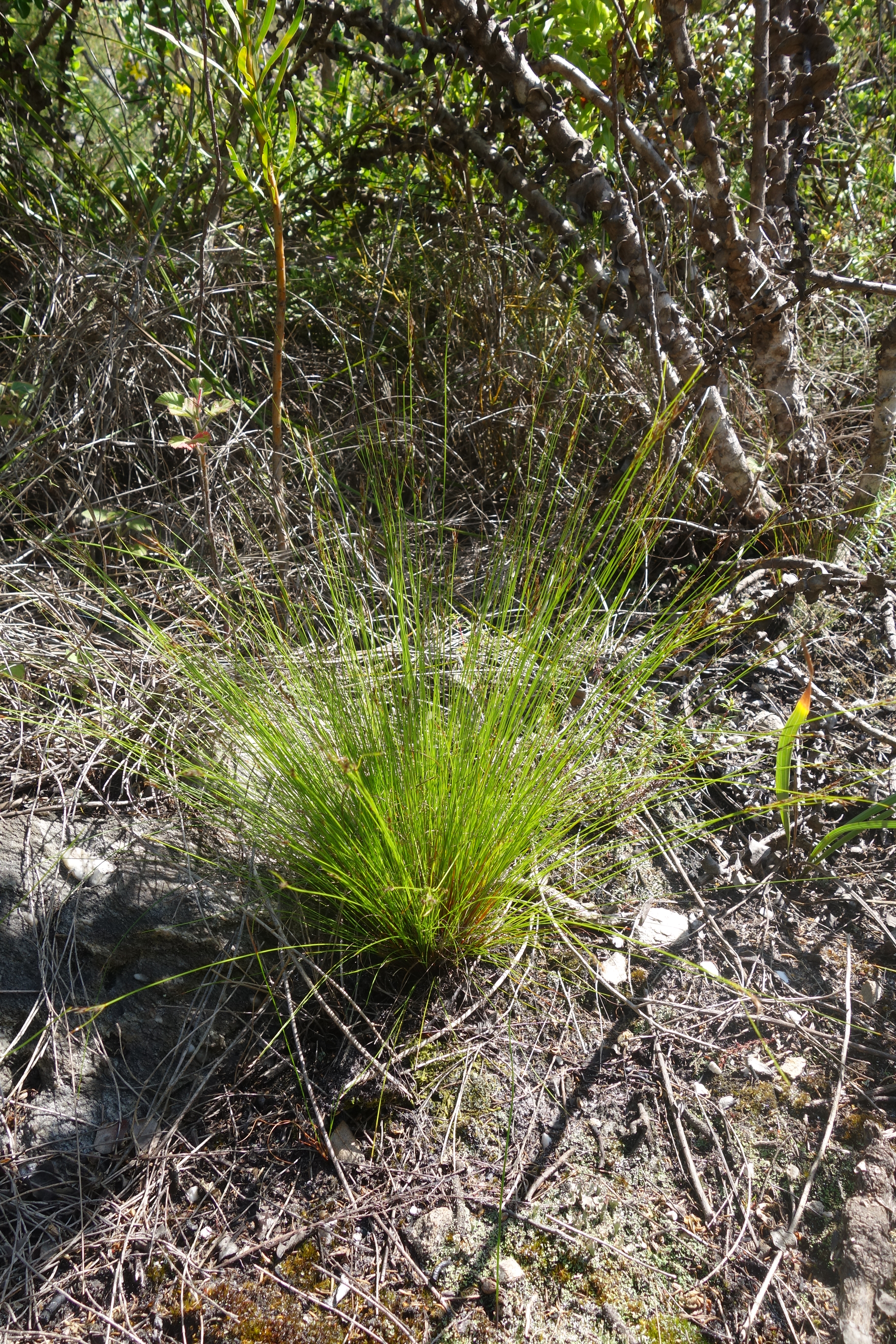
Growth form

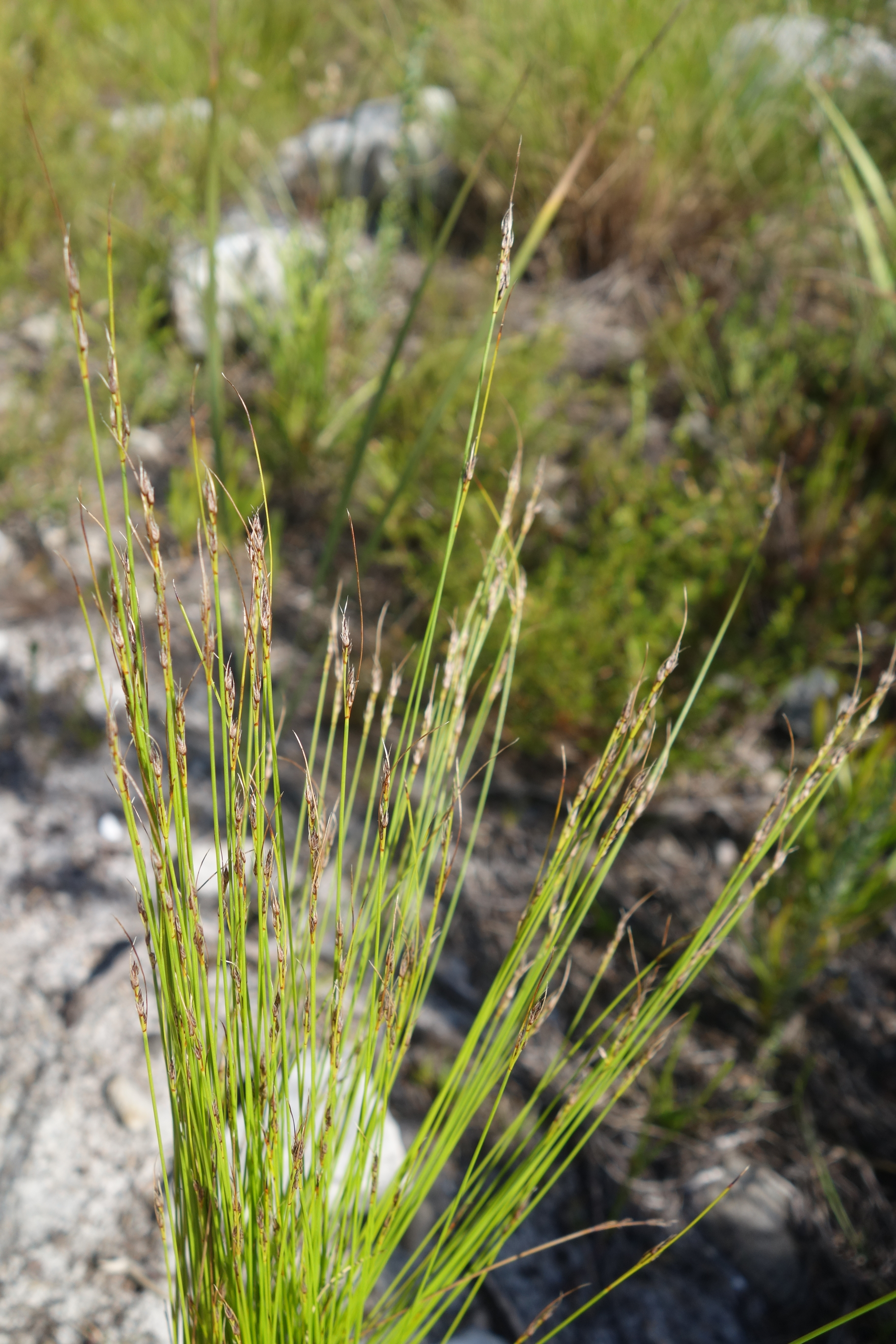
Flowering heads

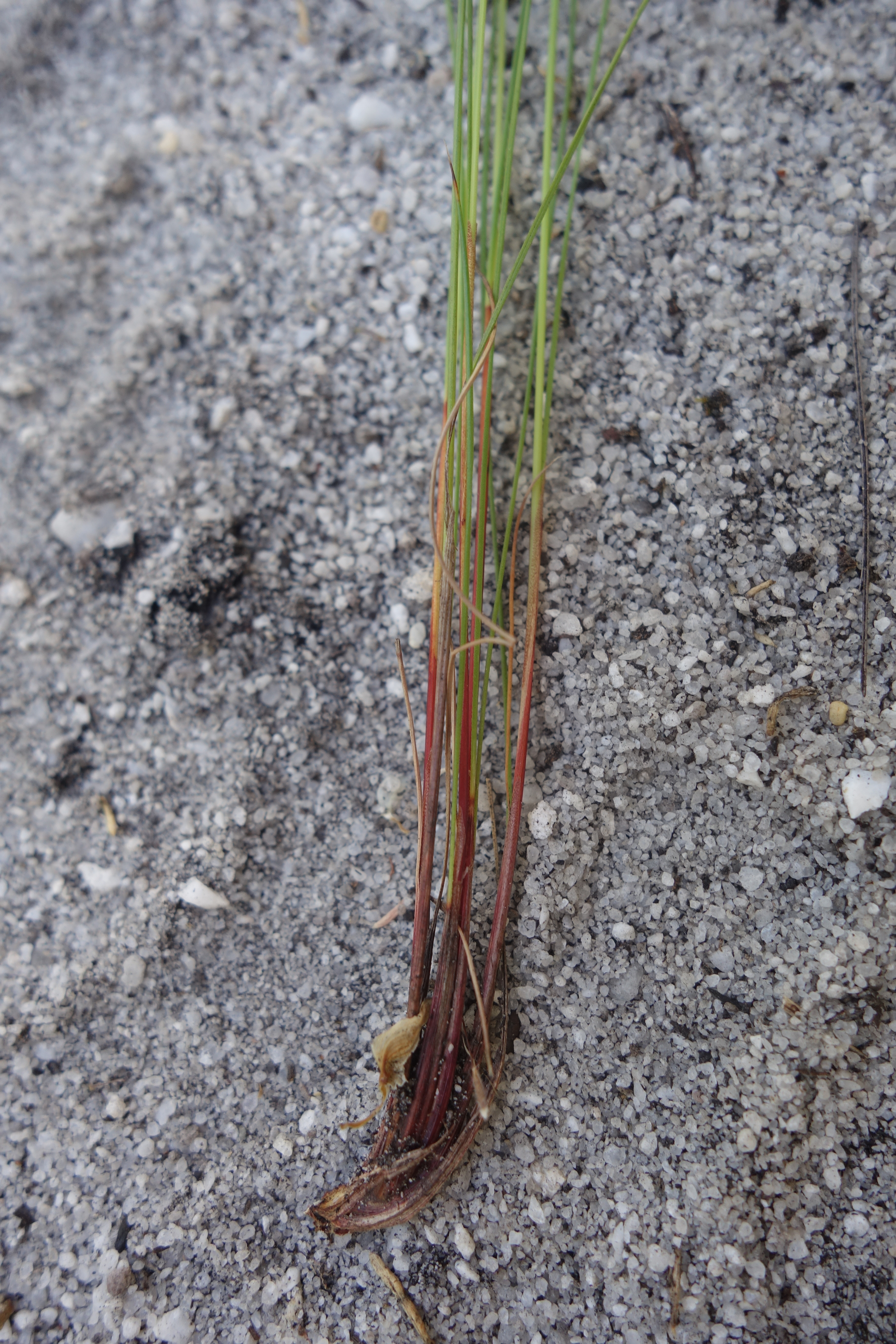
Culm bases
