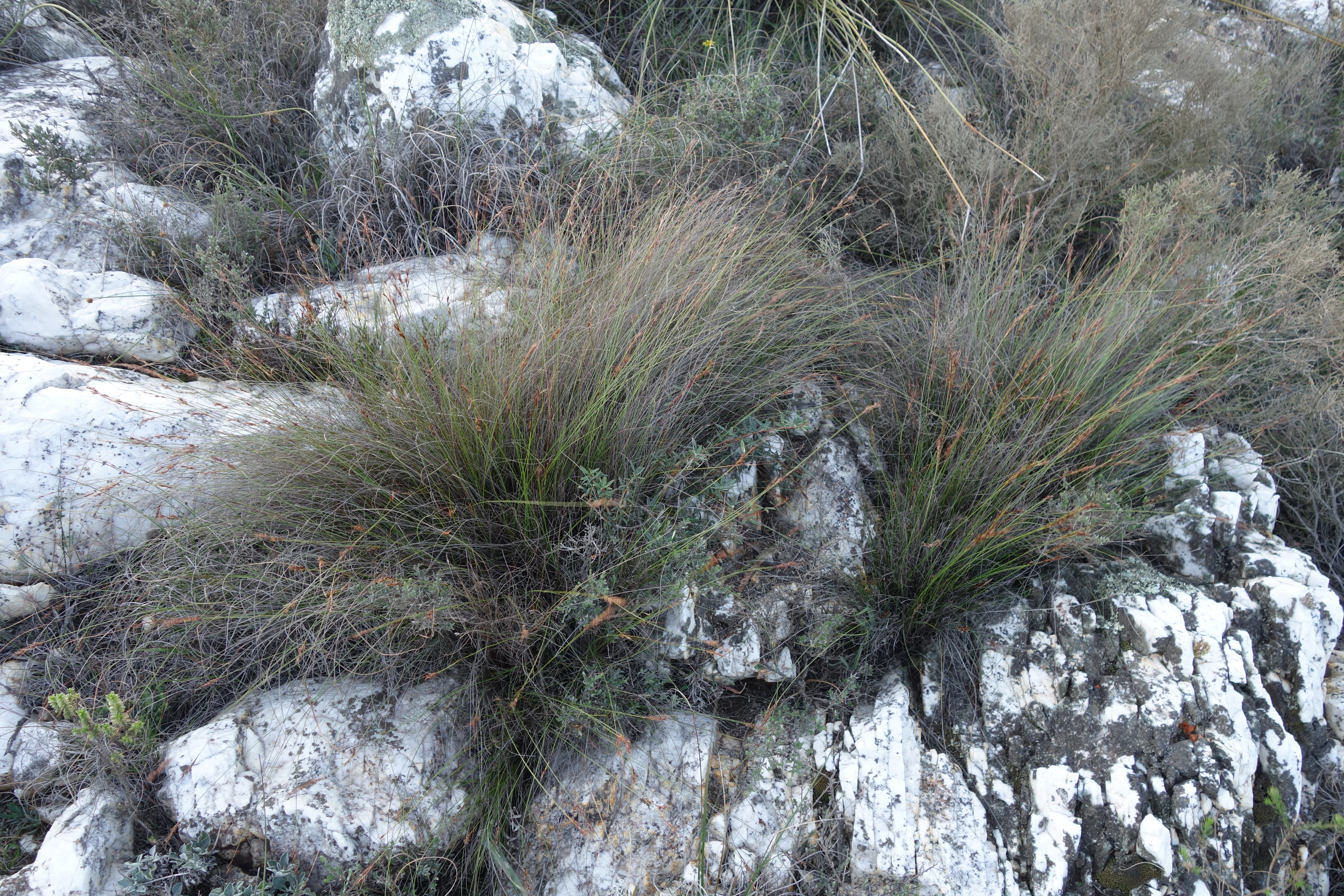
- Quartz veldrush

Scientific classification
- Kingdom: Plantae
- Clade: Tracheophytes
- Clade: Angiosperms
- Clade: Monocots
- Clade: Commelinids
- Order: Poales
- Family: Cyperaceae
- Genus: Schoenus
- Species: S. quartziticus

Binomial name
- Schoenus quartziticus T.L.Elliott & Muasya
- Documented collection localities

Synonyms
- None

= Schoenus quartziticus =

Species of grass-like plant

Schoenus quartziticus is a species of sedge endemic to the Agulhas Plain region of the Western Cape Province in southern South Africa.

== Diagnostic characters ==
Key diagnostic characters of this species include spikelets that are mostly less than 4.0 mm in length, with thin and membranaceous glumes. The plants resemble Schoenus exilis; however, the nutlets of S. quartziticus are broad elliptic, while those of S. exilis are narrow elliptic in shape.

Similar to other sedges, plants in this group are very difficult to identify. It appears that part of this problem is caused by the tendency of the southern African Schoenus to form hybrids with each other. It is not clear whether S. quartziticus forms hybrids with other southern African Schoenus species.

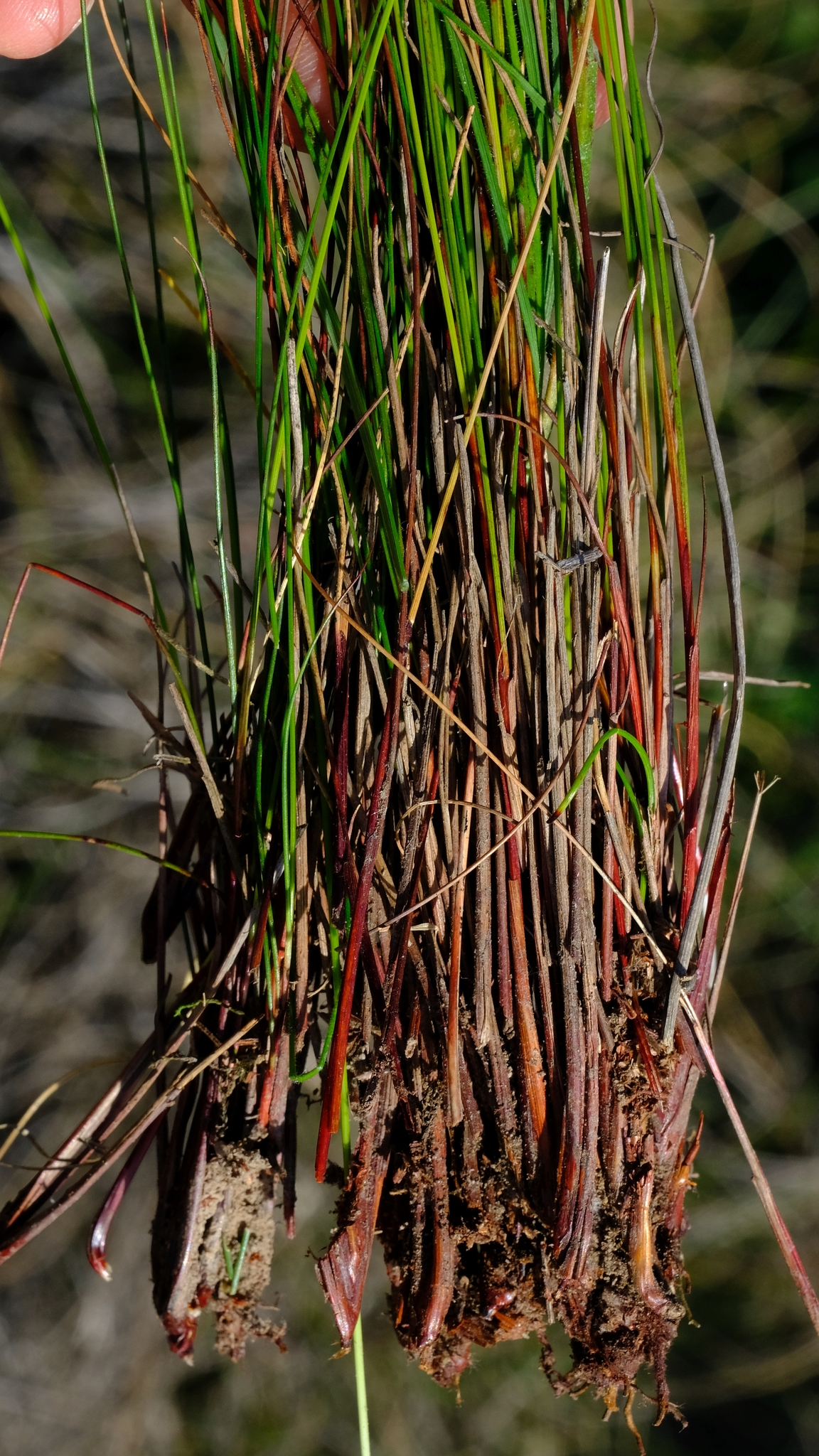
Bases of flowering stems

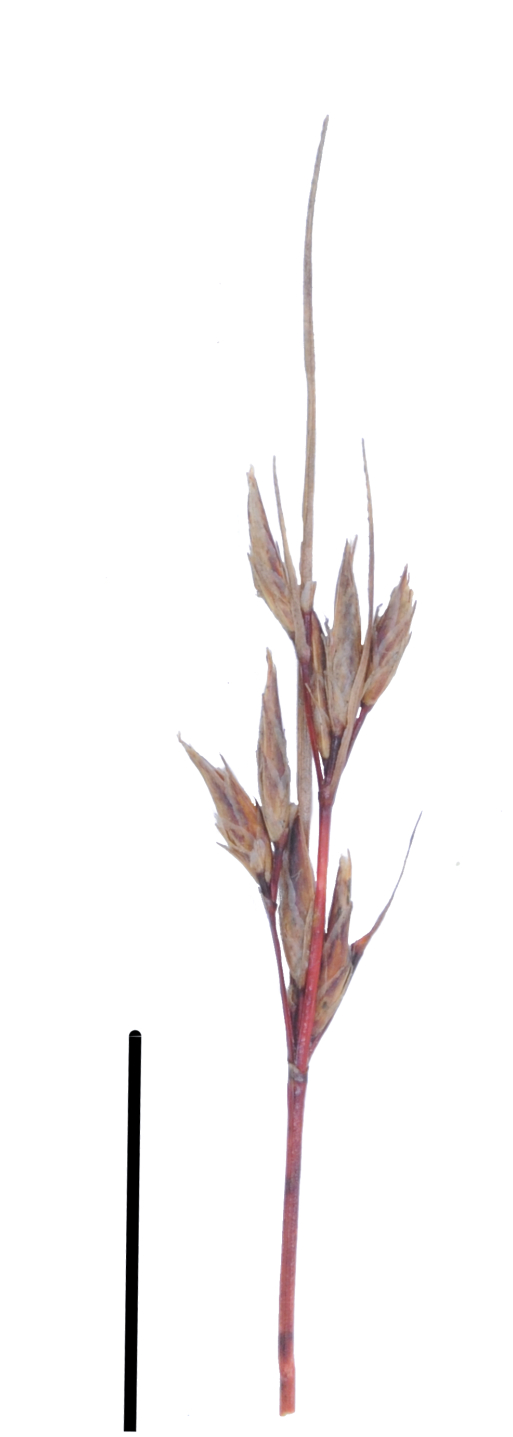
Flowering head (black scale bar represents 10 mm)

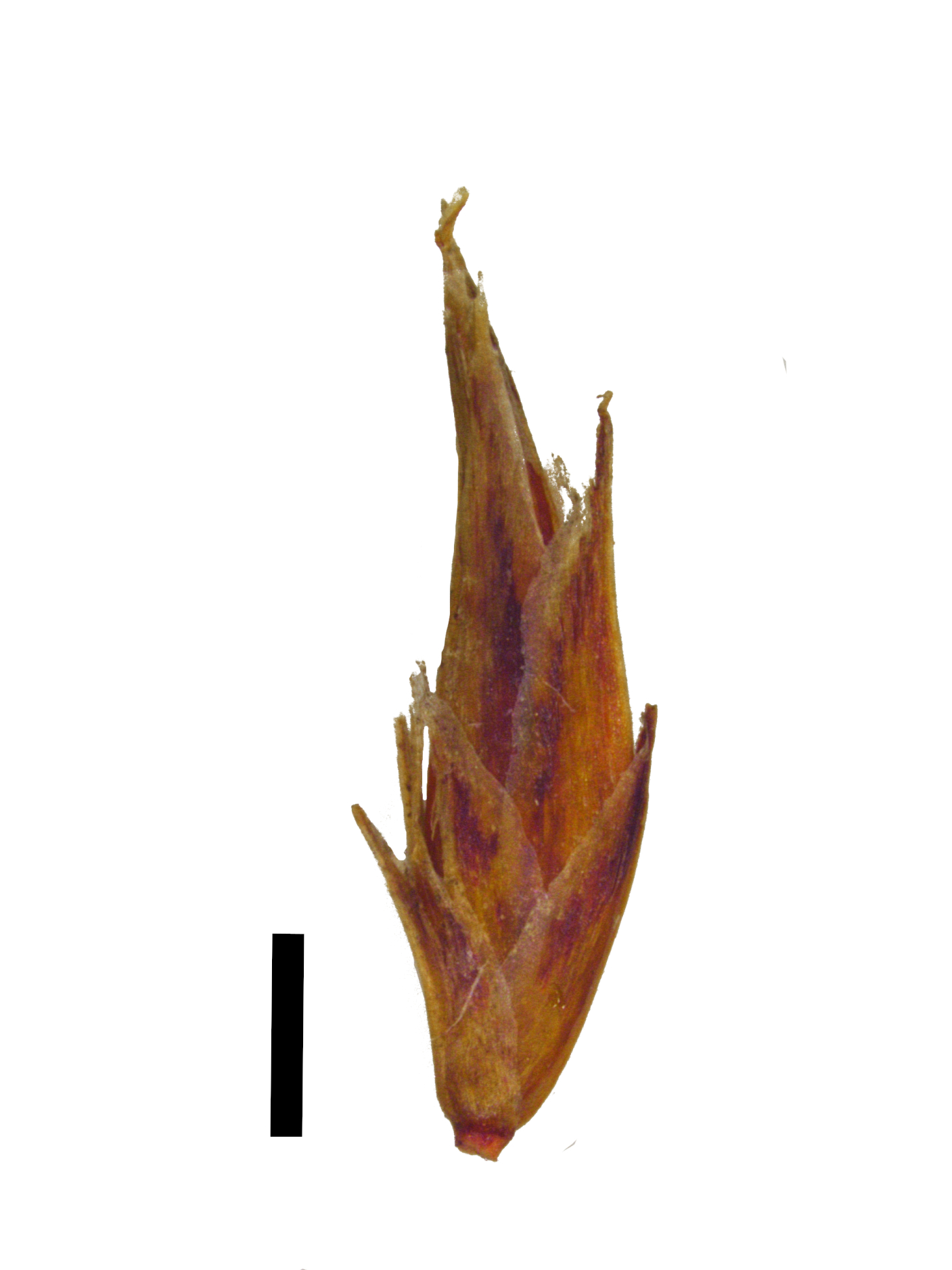
Spikelet (black scale bar represents 1 mm)

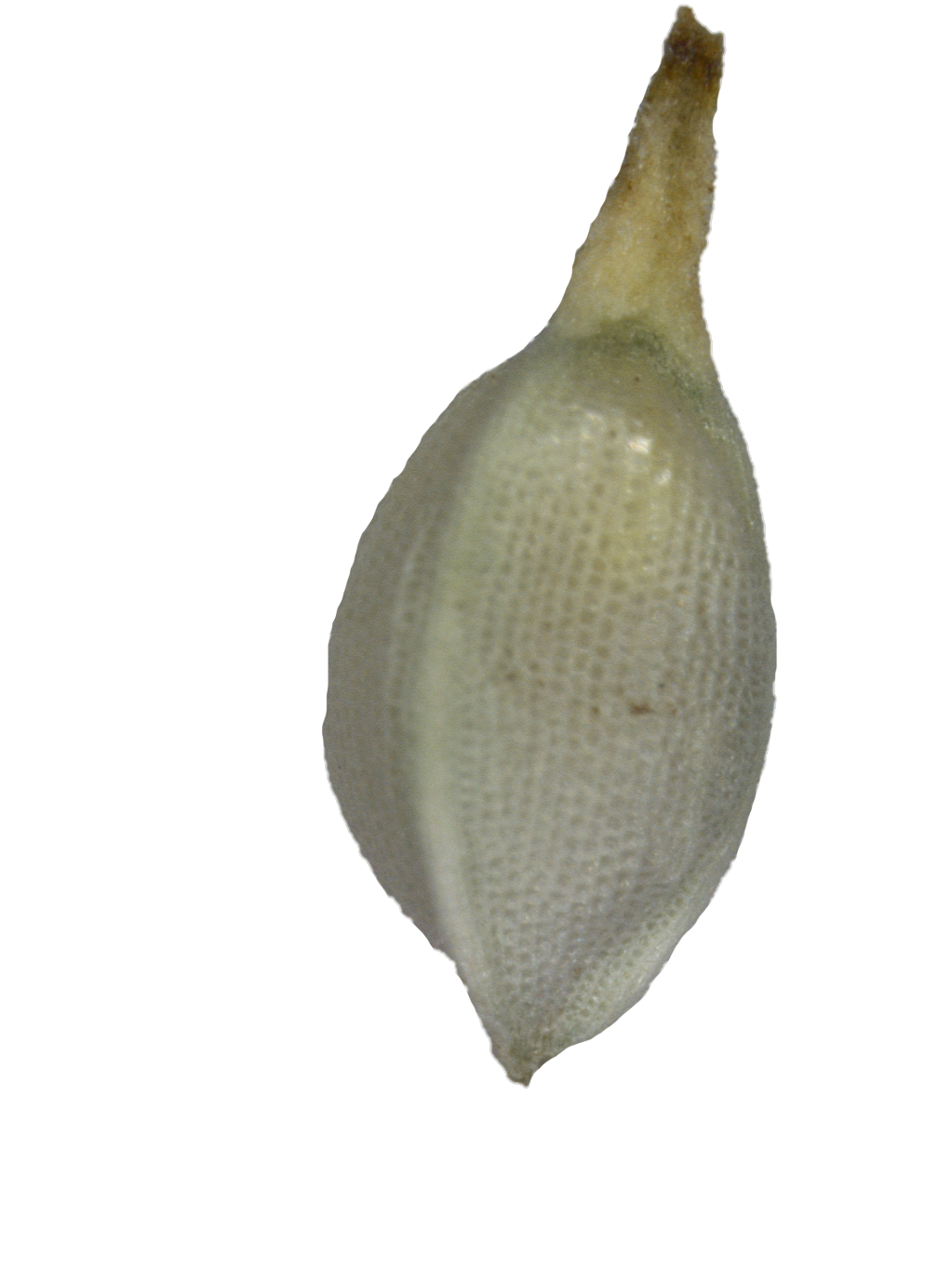
Nutlet

== Taxonomy ==
Schoenus quartziticus is a species in family Cyperaceae, tribe Schoeneae. Other notable genera in tribe Schoeneae include Lepidosperma, Oreobolus, Costularia, Tetraria and Gahnia. The most closely related species to S. quartziticus are other southern African Schoenus species, specifically, species in the S. cuspidatus and allies group that are endemic to the Agulhus Plain and Eastern Cape regions.

Southern African Schoenus were once classified as Tetraria; however, based on molecular and morphological differences, we now know that the two groups are evolutionary distinct. To ensure that this group of sedges is monophyletic (i.e. the genus only has closely related species), several species of Epischoenus and the southern African Tetraria were transferred into Schoenus. In the field, the southern African Schoenus can be distinguished from Tetraria species by their lack of stem leaves and the absence of reticulate sheaths at the bases of the flowering stems.

== Distribution and ecology ==
Schoenus quartziticus is currently known to occur in quartz patches on shale-derived soils of the Agulhas Plain region of South Africa. It is likely that only a very few populations of this species remain.

== Images ==
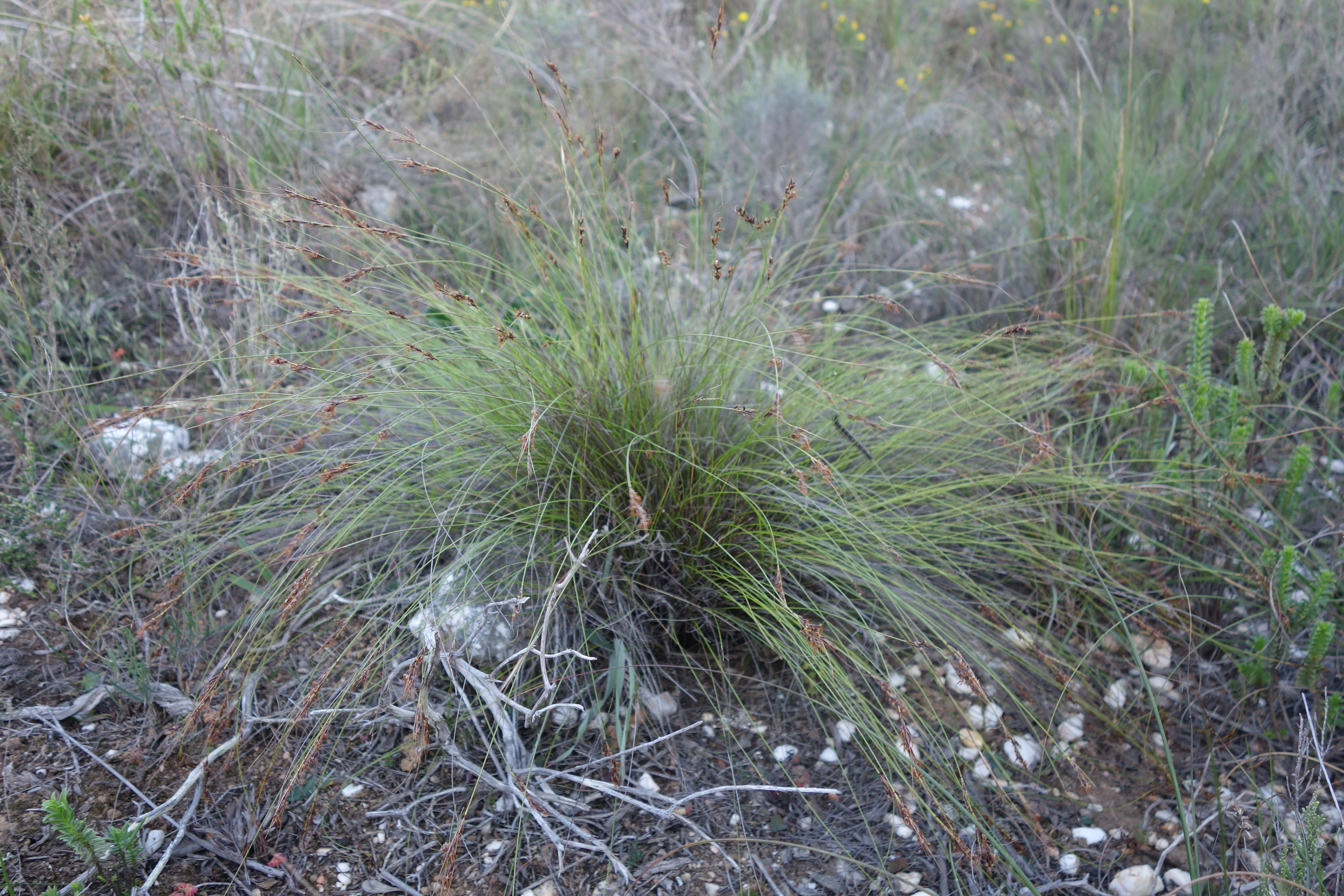
S. quartziticus growth form

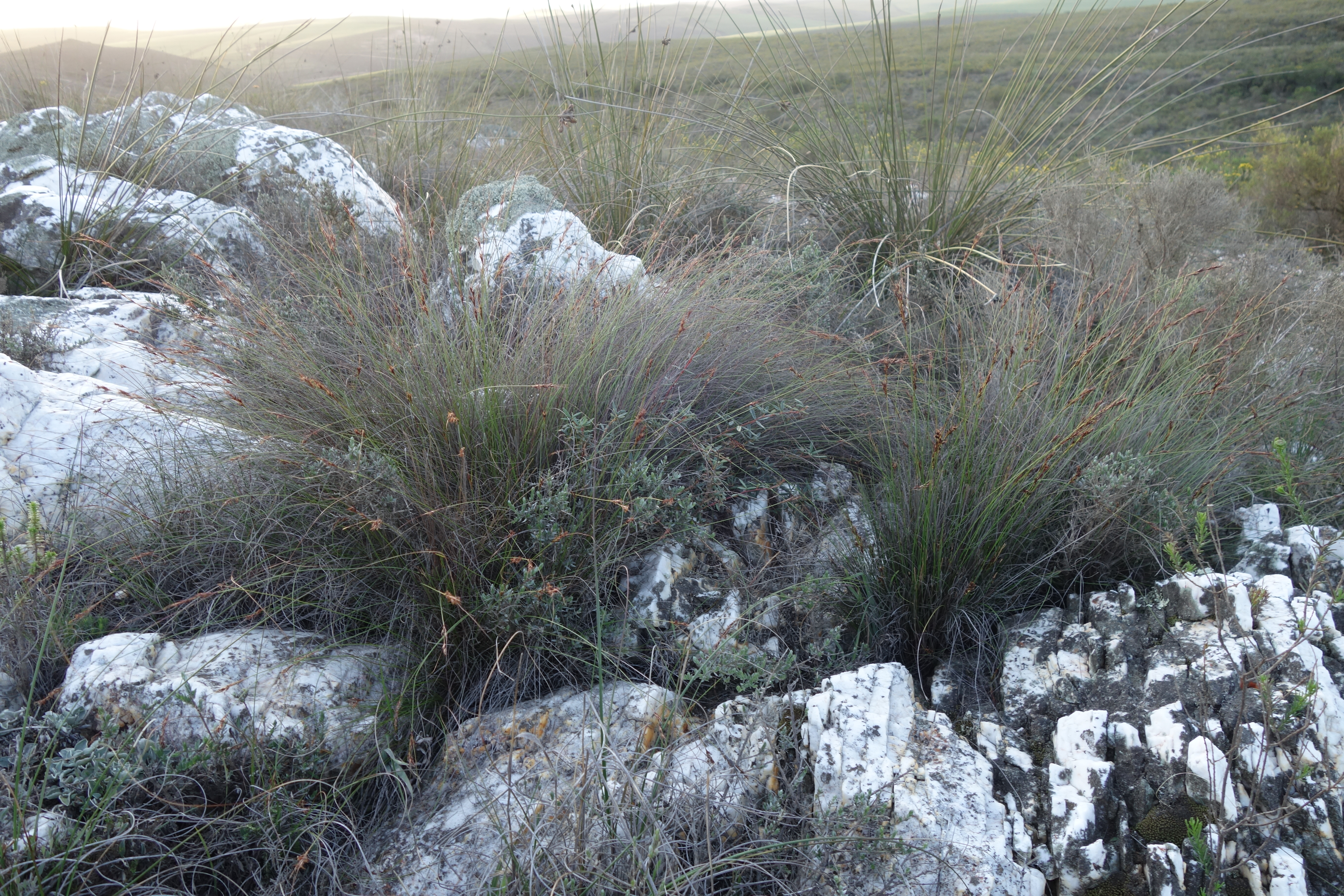
In its native renosterveld habitat
