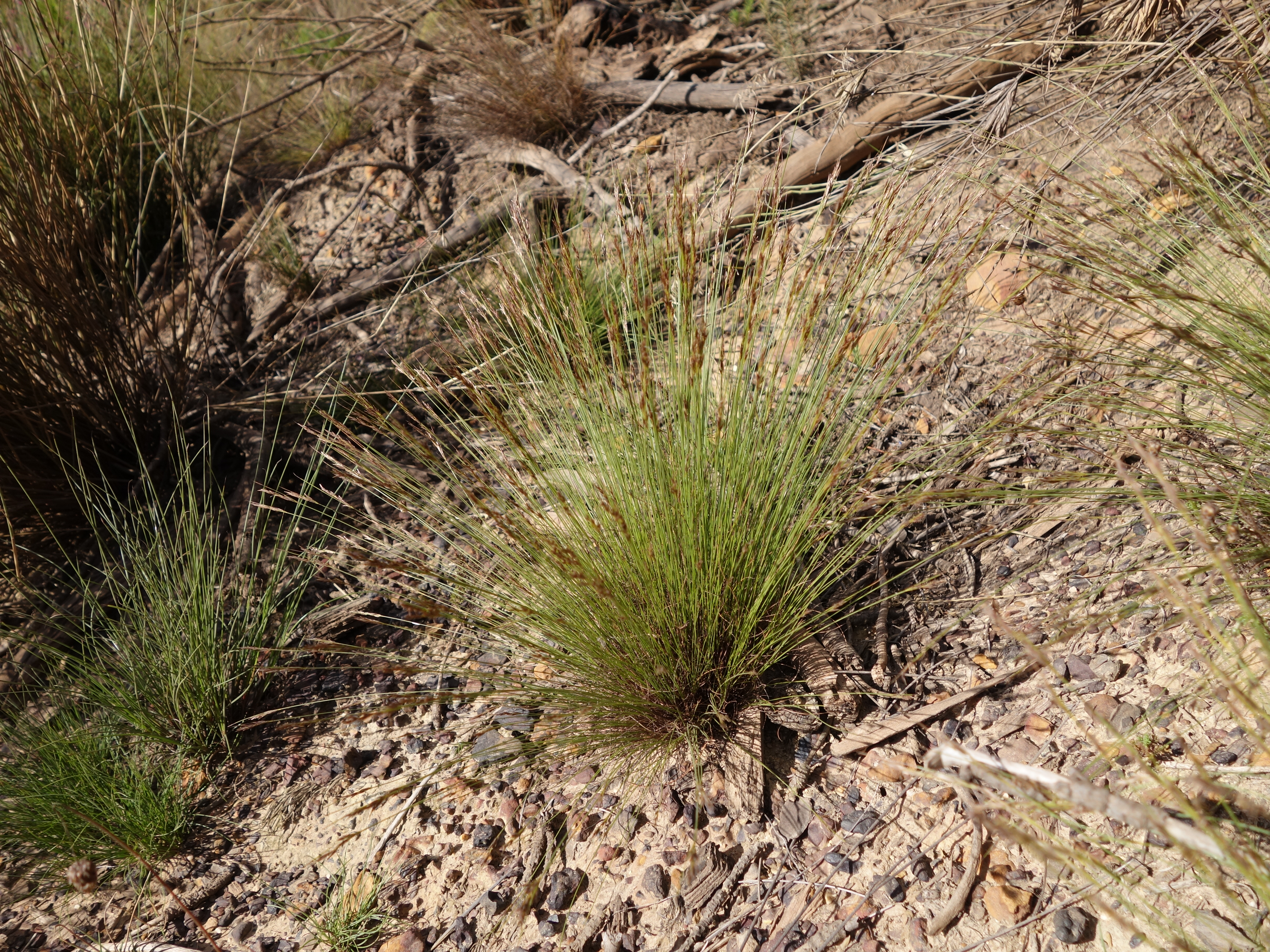
- Small veldrush

Scientific classification
- Kingdom: Plantae
- Clade: Tracheophytes
- Clade: Angiosperms
- Clade: Monocots
- Clade: Commelinids
- Order: Poales
- Family: Cyperaceae
- Genus: Schoenus
- Species: S. exilis

Binomial name
- Schoenus exilis (Levyns) T.L.Elliott & Muasya
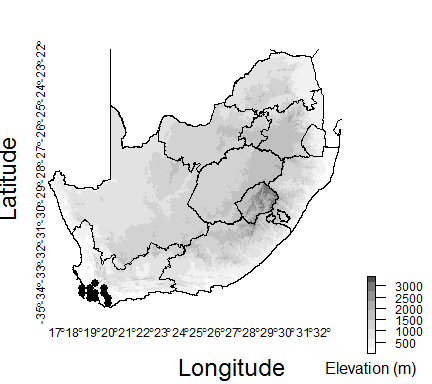
- Documented collection localities

Synonyms
- Tetraria exilis Levyns

= Schoenus exilis =

Species of grass-like plant

Schoenus exilis is a species of sedge endemic to the western areas of the Western Cape Province of South Africa.

== Description ==
The key diagnostic character of S. exilis are its narrow, lanceolate spikelets and narrow elliptic nutlets.

Schoenus exilis resembles Schoenus ligulatus, but the latter species is taller (>350 mm) compared to the shorter S. exilis. Another critical difference is that S. ligulatus has longer spikelets (mostly >4.5 mm) compared to the shorter (<4.5 mm) spikelets of S. exilis.

Schoenus quartziticus is also a similar species; however, it has broad elliptic nutlets.

Similar to other sedges, plants in this group are very difficult to identify. It appears that part of this problem is caused by the tendency of the southern African Schoenus to form hybrids with each other. It appears that Schoenus exilis forms hybrids with other southern African Schoenus species, specifically Schoenus cuspidatus.

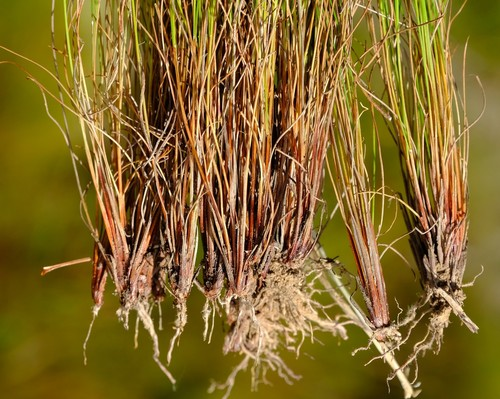
Bases of flowering stems (culms)

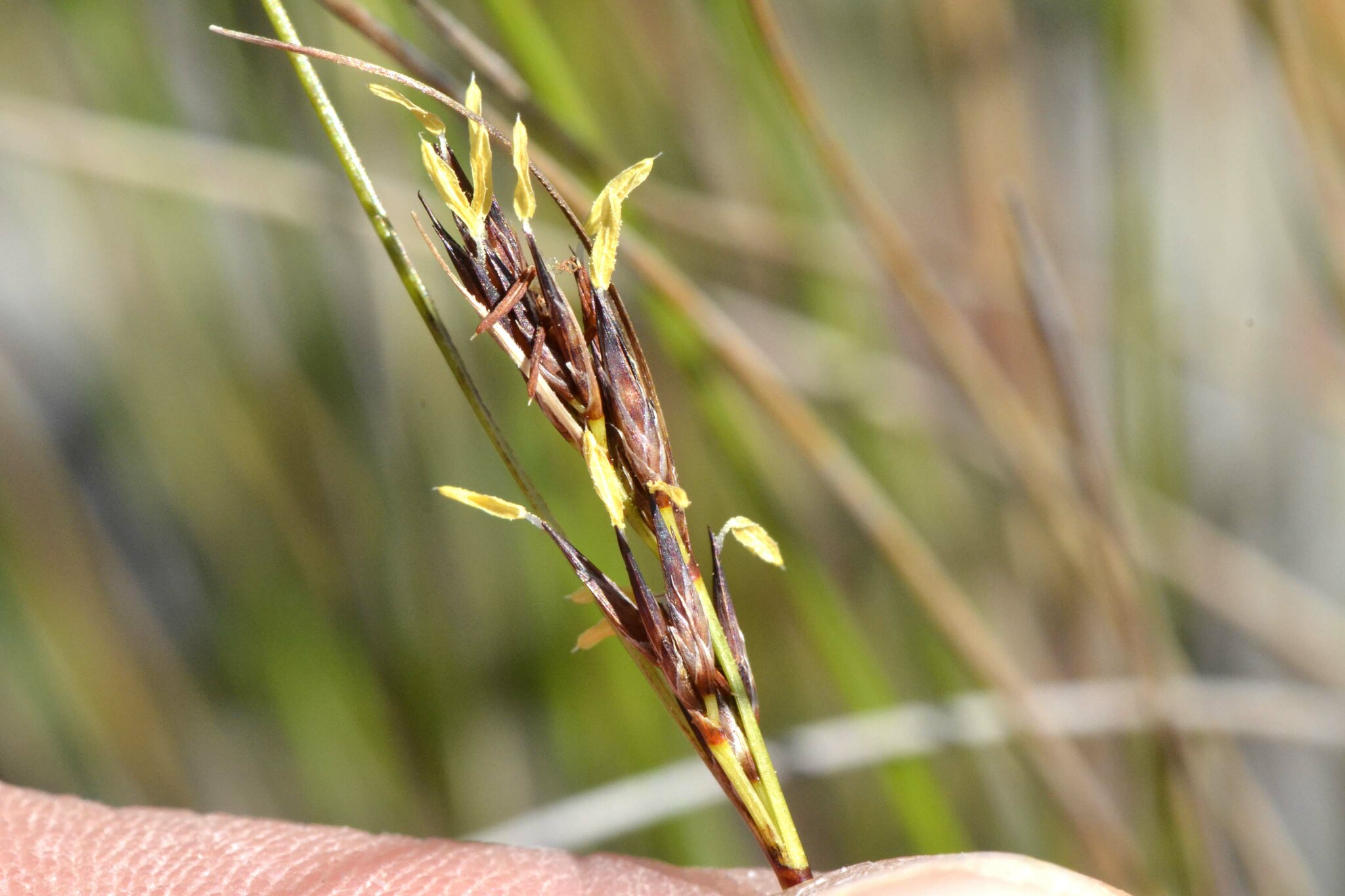
Flowering head

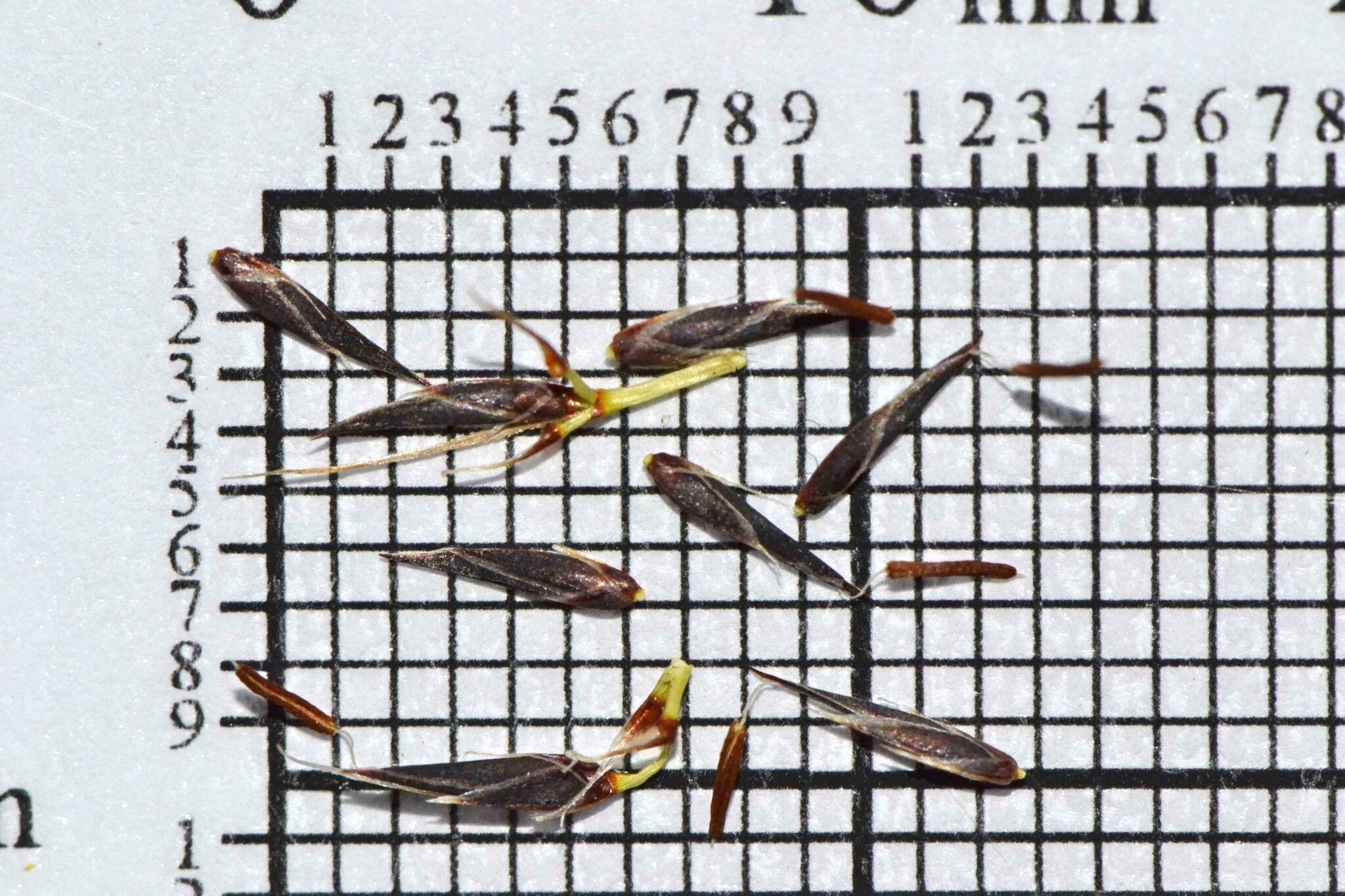
Spikelets

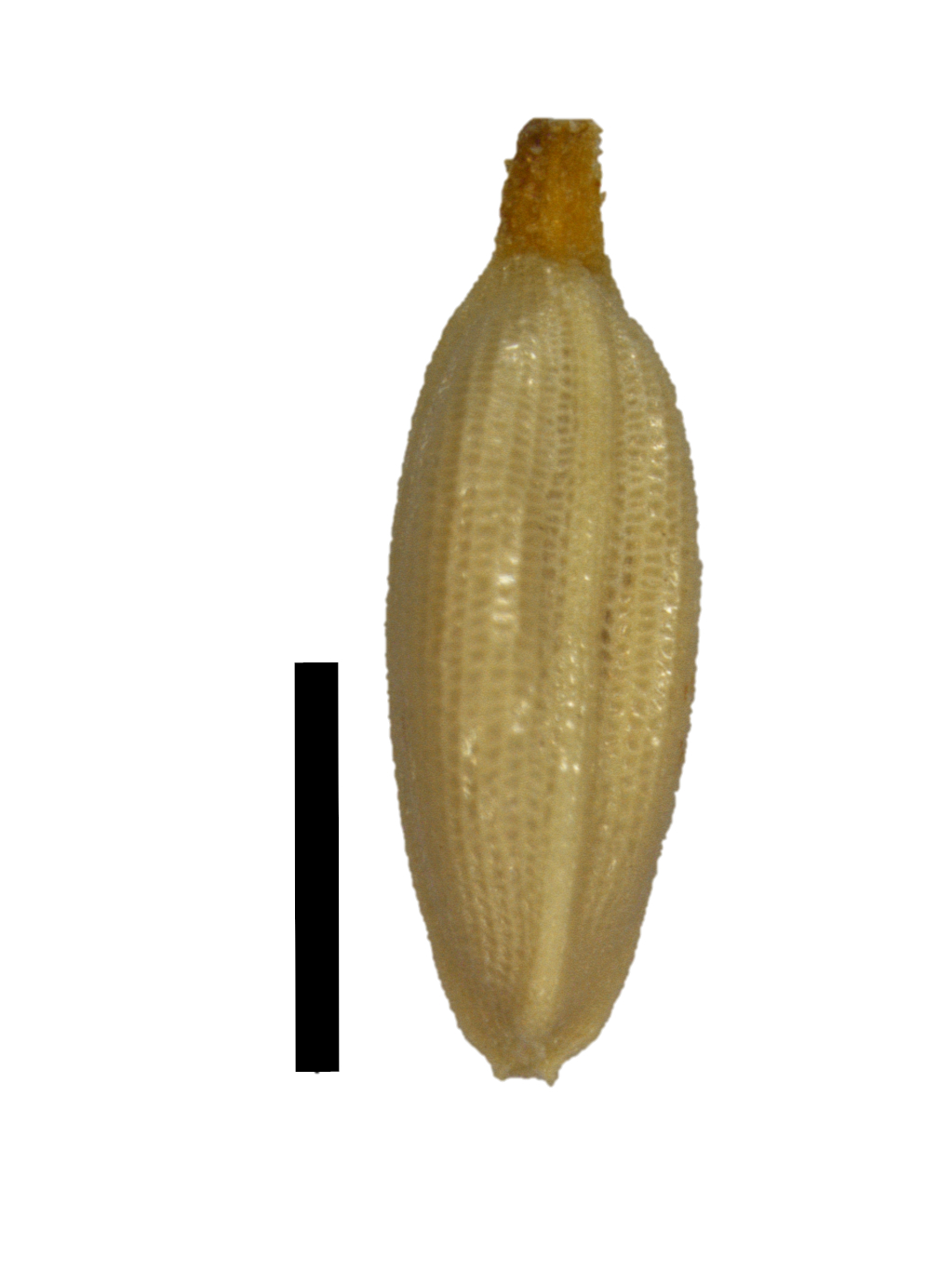
Nutlet (black scale bar represents 1 mm)

== Taxonomy ==
The genus Schoenus is in the tribe Schoeneae of the sedge family, Cyperaceae. Other genera in the tribe include Lepidosperma, Oreobolus, Costularia, Tetraria and Gahnia. The most closely related species to S. exilis are other southern African Schoenus species, specifically, species in the S. cuspidatus and allies group.

Further taxonomic work is required to delineate the difference between S. cuspidatus and S. exilis, especially in the western mountains of the Western Cape Province.

Southern African Schoenus were once classified as Tetraria; however, based on molecular and morphological differences, we now know that the two groups are evolutionary distinct. To ensure that this group of sedges is monophyletic (i.e. the genus only has closely related species), several species of Epischoenus and the southern African Tetraria were transferred into Schoenus. In the field, the southern African Schoenus can be distinguished from Tetraria species by their lack of stem leaves and the absence of reticulate sheaths at the bases of the flowering stems.

== Distribution and habitat ==
Schoenus exilis is found in the western region of the Western Cape Province of South Africa. This species generally occurs on damp sites on sandstone-derived soils; however, it has also been collected from granite-derived soils. The reported elevation range of S. exilis is between sea level and over 400 m.

== Images ==
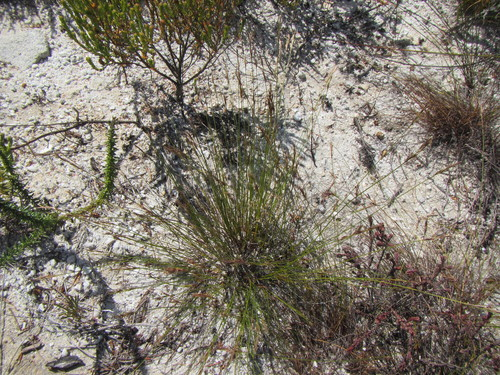
Growth form

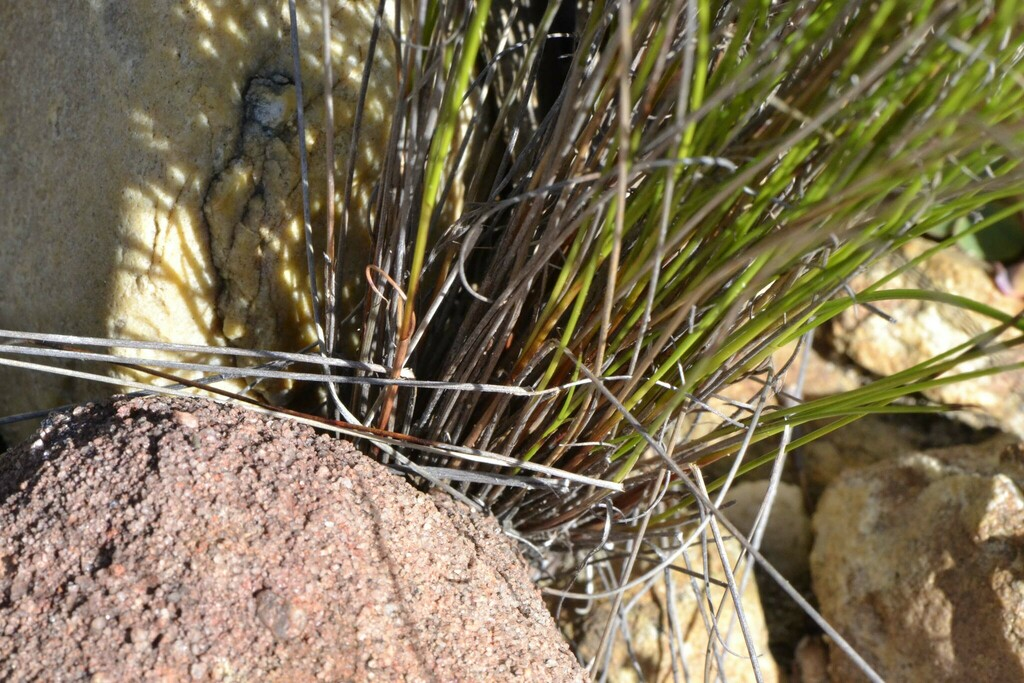
Bases of flowering stems (culms)

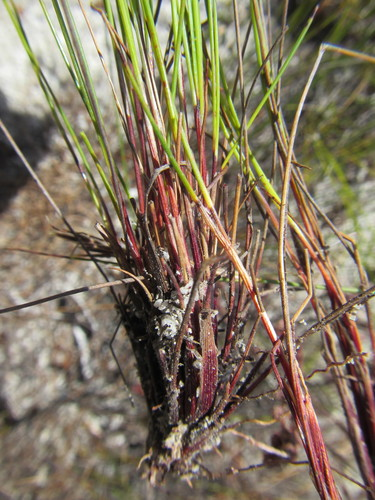
Bases of flowering stems (culms)

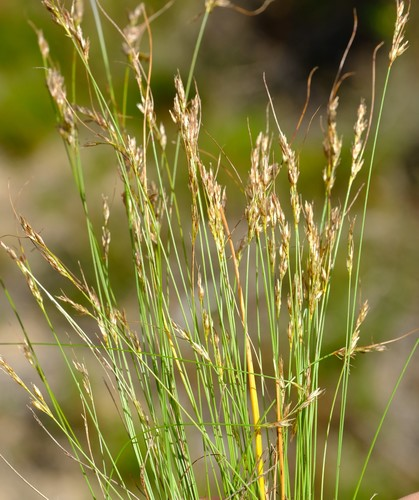
Flowering heads

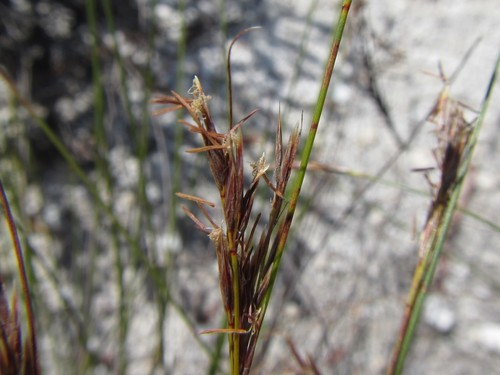
Flowering heads

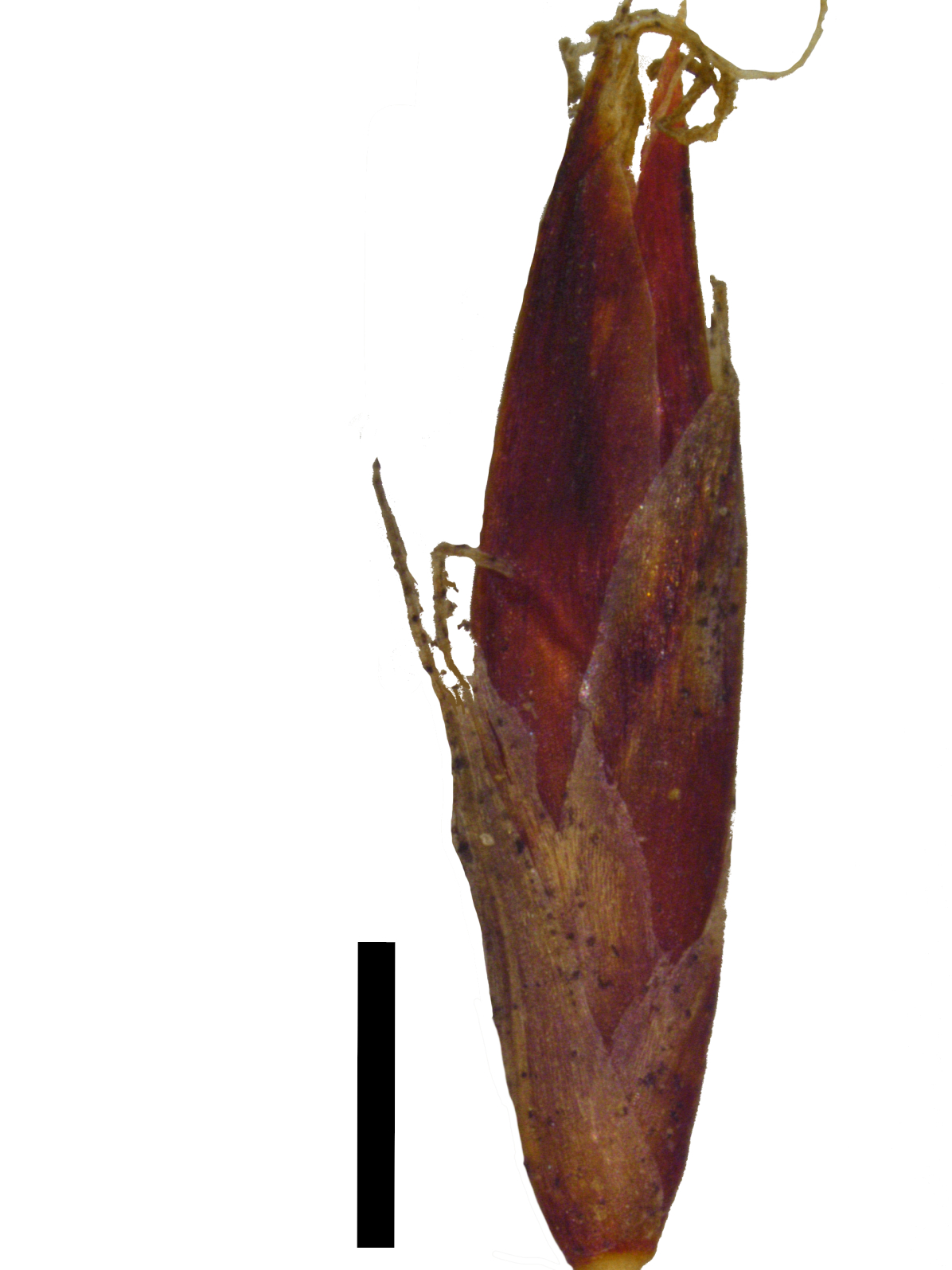
Spikelet (black scale bar represents 1 mm)
