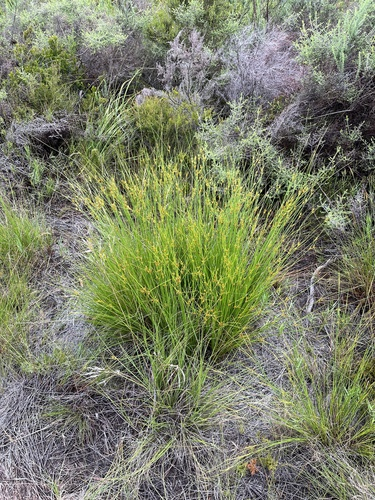
- Foothill Veldrush

Scientific classification
- Kingdom: Plantae
- Clade: Tracheophytes
- Clade: Angiosperms
- Clade: Monocots
- Clade: Commelinids
- Order: Poales
- Family: Cyperaceae
- Genus: Schoenus
- Species: S. comparoides

Binomial name
- Schoenus comparoides T.L.Elliott & Muasya
- Documented collection localities in South Africa

Synonyms
- None

= Schoenus comparoides =

Species of grass-like plant

Schoenus comparoides is a species of sedge endemic to the mountains of southern South Africa.

== Description ==
Schoenus comparoides was initially included in the circumscription of Schoenus compar because of the morphological similarities between the two species. However, S. comparoides lacks the viscous culm bases that are evident in S. compar. A second key difference between the two species is that all of the spikelet glumes of S. compar are thick and firm, whereas only the lower glumes of S. comparoides are thick and firm. Furthermore, the distribution of the two species differs with S. comparoides found more on mountainous slopes of the eastern Western Cape Province into adjacent regions of the Eastern Cape Province, whereas S. compar is found farther to the west and along the south-western coast of South Africa.

Another species that closely resembles S. comparoides is Schoenus arenicola, but the leaves of S. arenicola are shorter compared to those of the former species. Another key difference between the two species are the beaks of the nutlets, with the nutlet beaks of S. arenicola being continuous with the body of the nutlet, whereas those of S. comparoides are distinct and slightly bulge over the nutlet body. Schoenus arenicola also differs in its distribution, as it is endemic to the coarse-textured soils of the south-western coast of South Africa.

Plants in the southern African Schoenus clade are very difficult to identify, which is similar to other sedges. It appears that part of this problem is caused by the tendency of the southern African Schoenus to form hybrids with each other. It is possible that S. comparoides might form hybrids with other species in the Schoenus compar – Schoenus pictus and allies group, but evidence for this relationship is lacking.

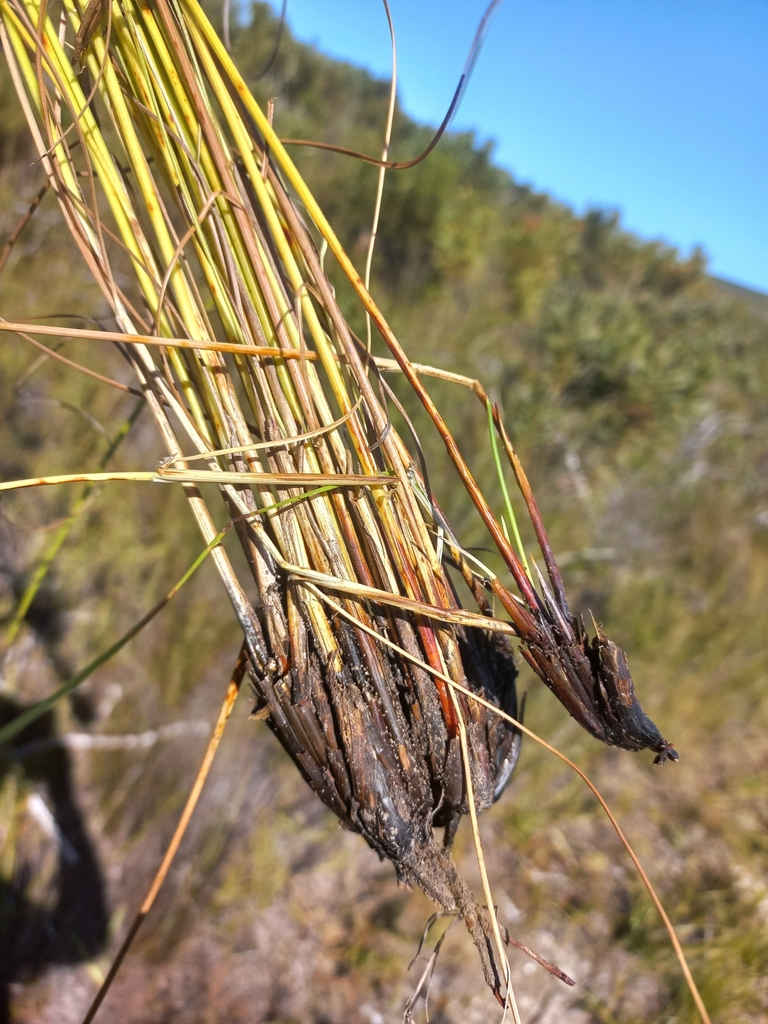
Base of flowering stems

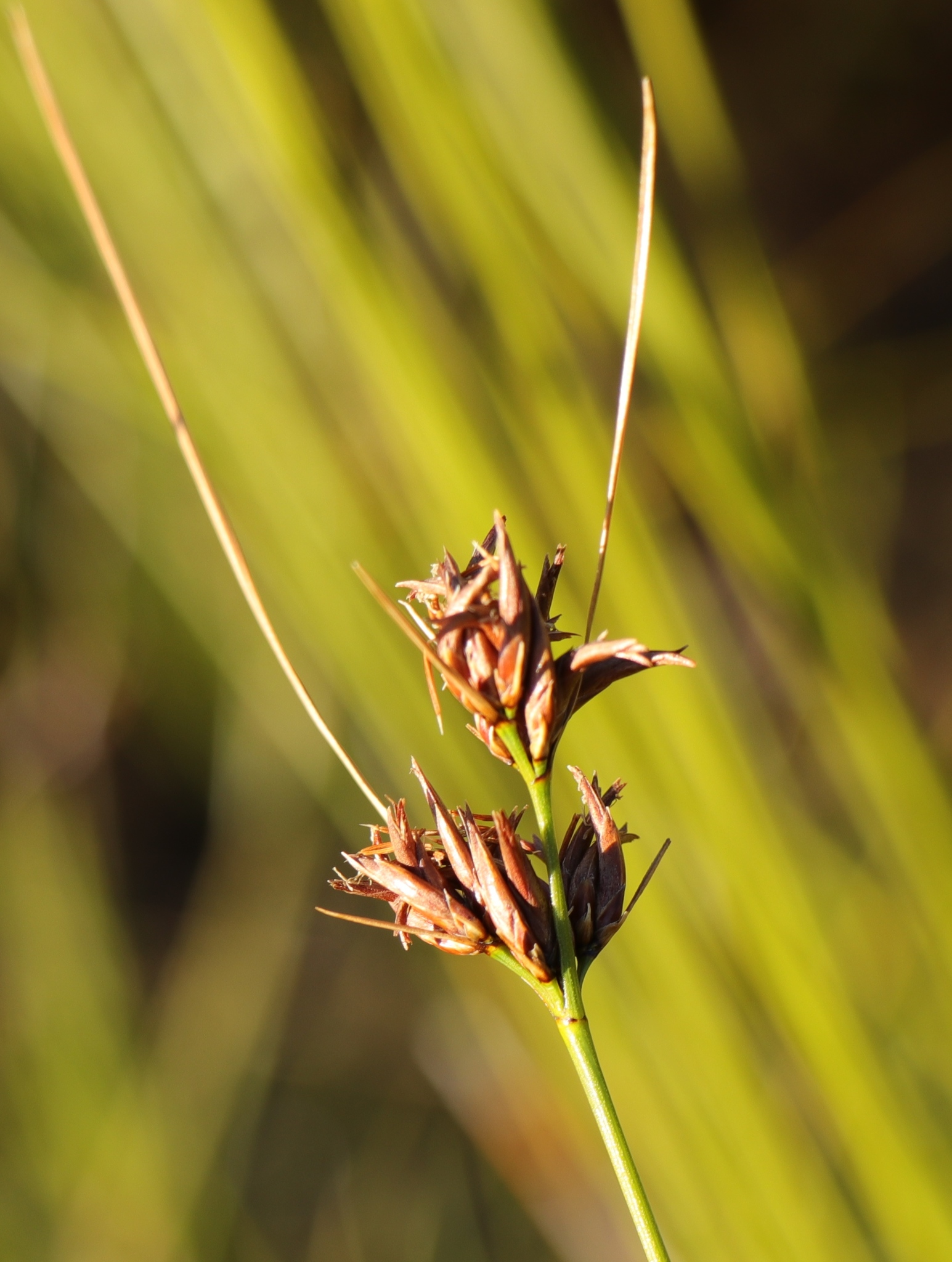
Inflorescence (flowering head)

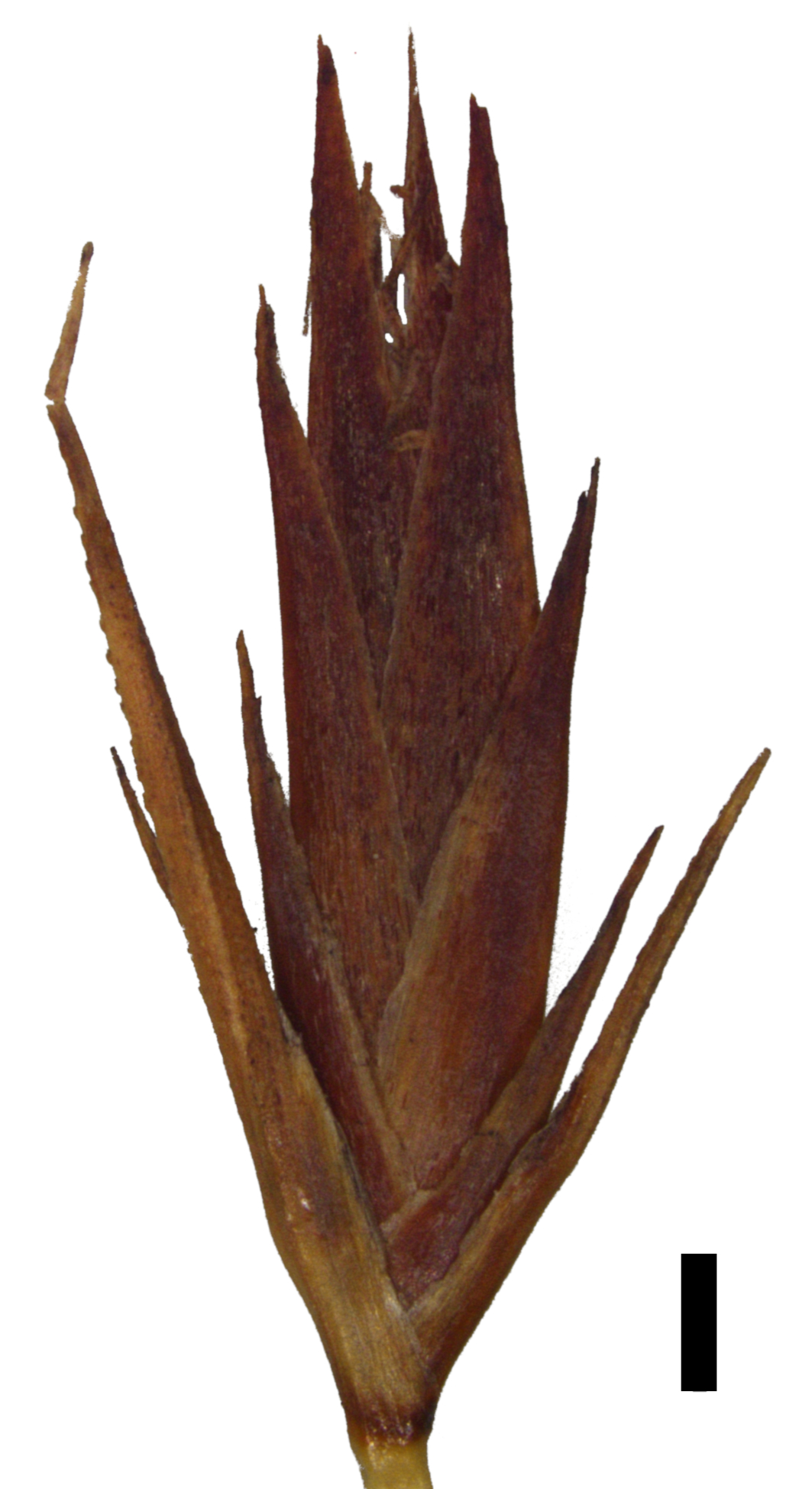
Spikelet (black scale bar represents 1 mm)

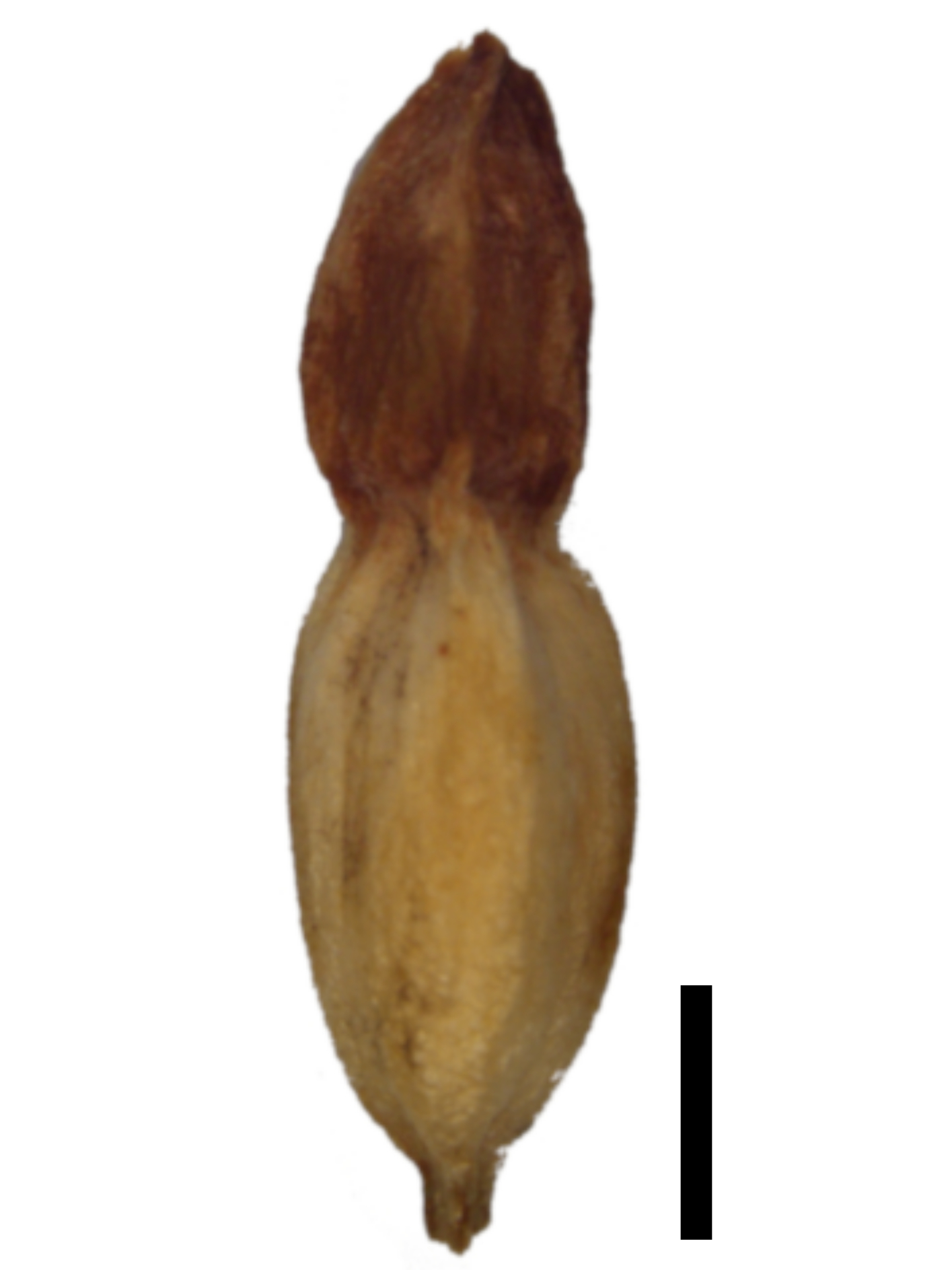
Nutlet (black scale bar represents 1 mm)

== Taxonomy ==
Schoenus comparoides is a species in family Cyperaceae, tribe Schoeneae. Other notable genera in tribe Schoeneae include Lepidosperma, Oreobolus, Costularia, Tetraria and Gahnia. The most closely related species to S. comparoides are other southern African Schoenus species in the Schoenus compar – Schoenus pictus and allies group.

Southern African Schoenus were once classified as Tetraria; however, based on molecular and morphological differences, we now know that the two groups are evolutionary distinct. To ensure that this group of sedges is monophyletic (i.e. the genus only has closely related species), several species of Epischoenus and the southern African Tetraria were transferred into Schoenus. In the field, the southern African Schoenus can be distinguished from Tetraria species by their lack of stem leaves and the absence of reticulate sheaths at the bases of the flowering stems.

== Distribution and habitat ==
Schoenus comparoides is known to occur in eastern parts of the Western Cape Province and adjacent parts of the Eastern Cape Province of South Africa. Observations of this species have been documented from low to medium elevation mountain slopes on various parent materials.

== Images ==
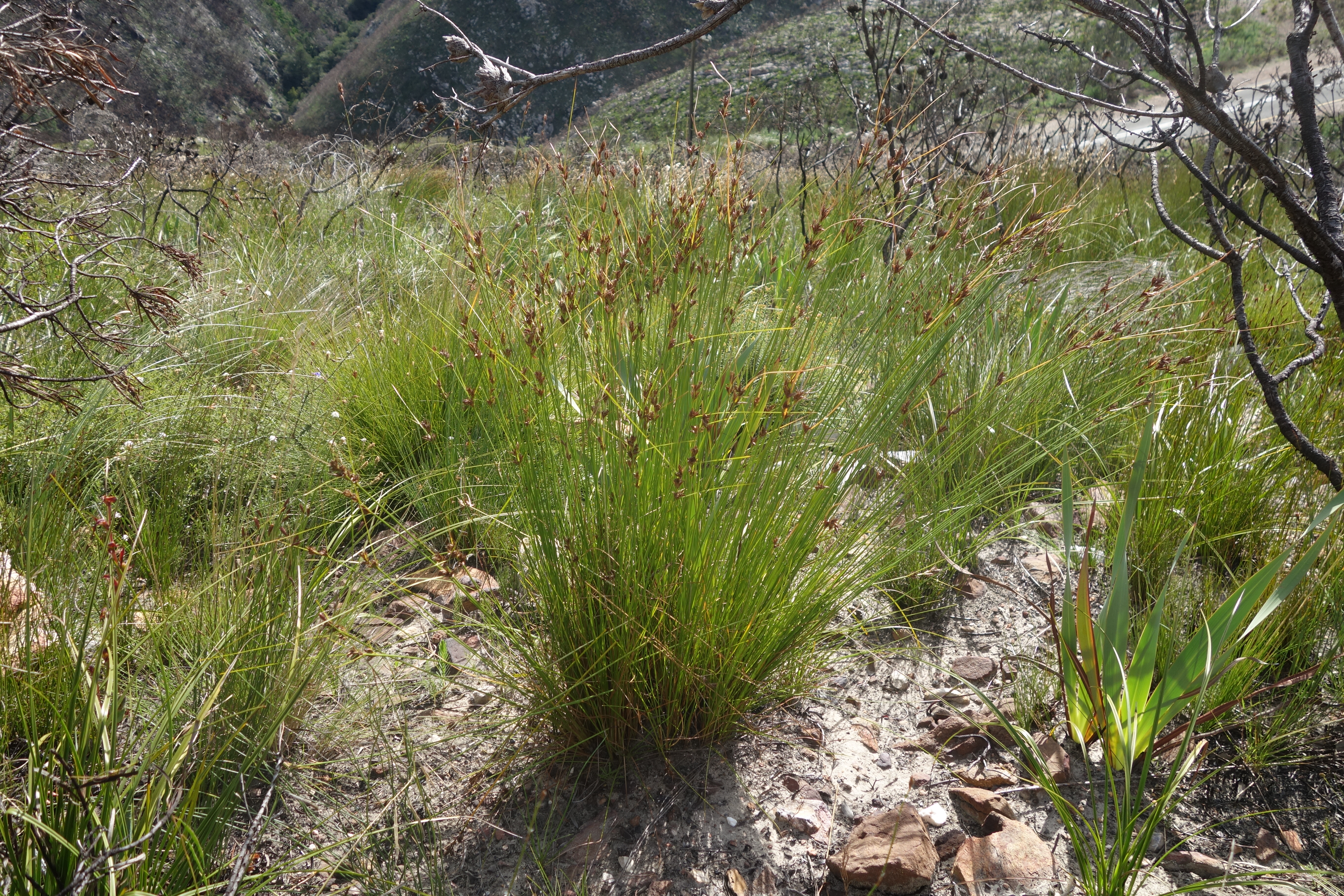
Growth form

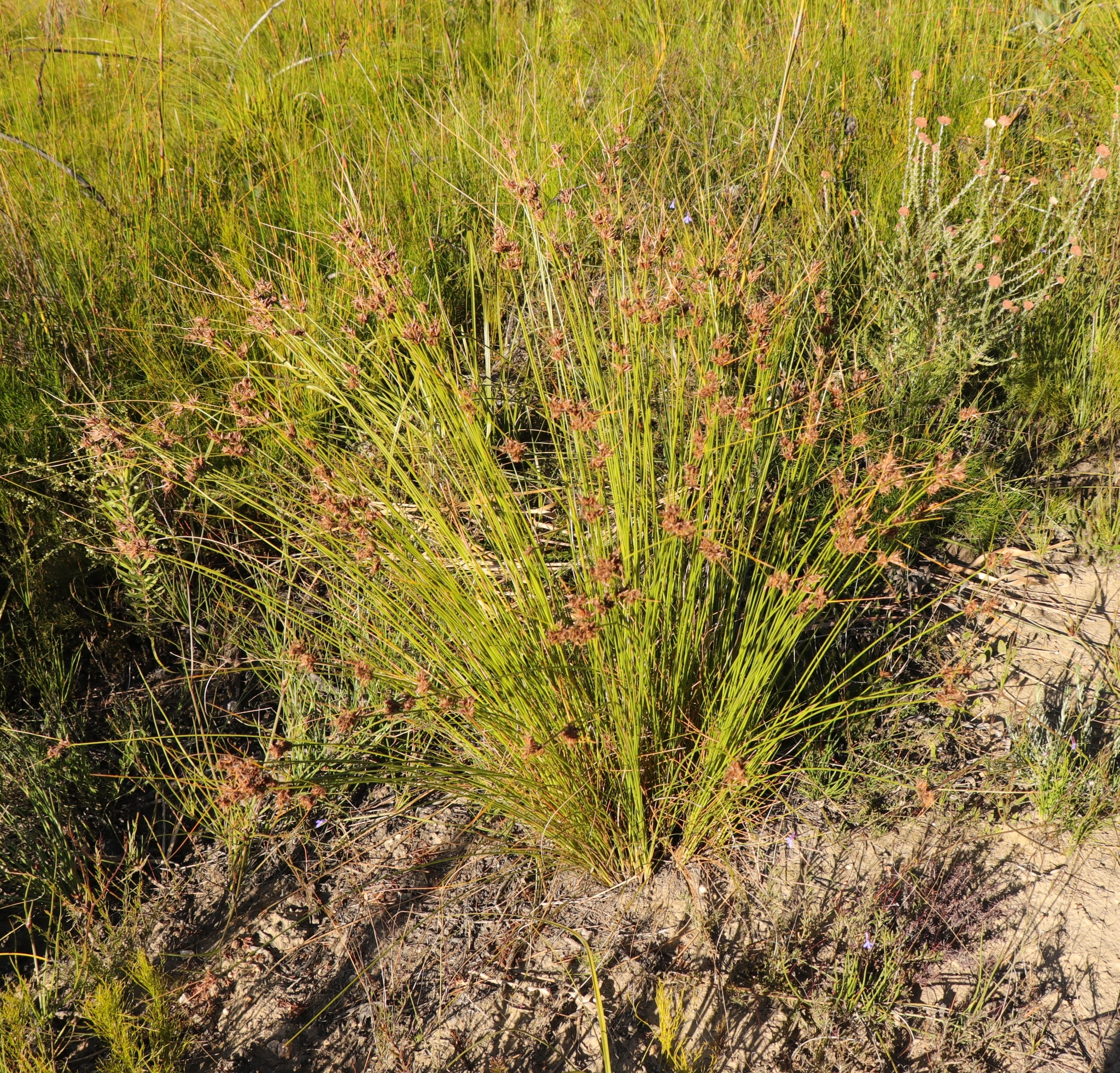
Growth form

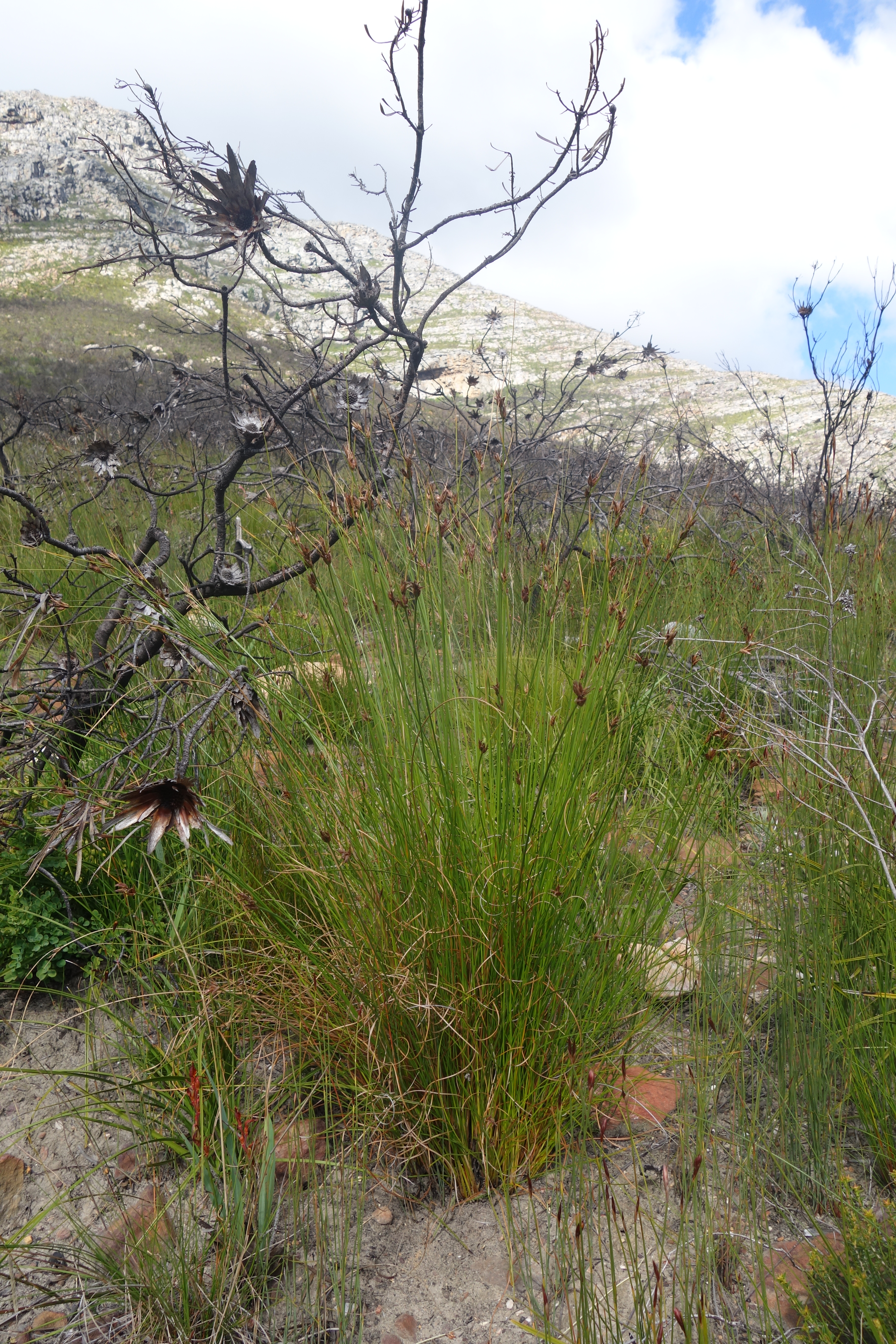
Growth form

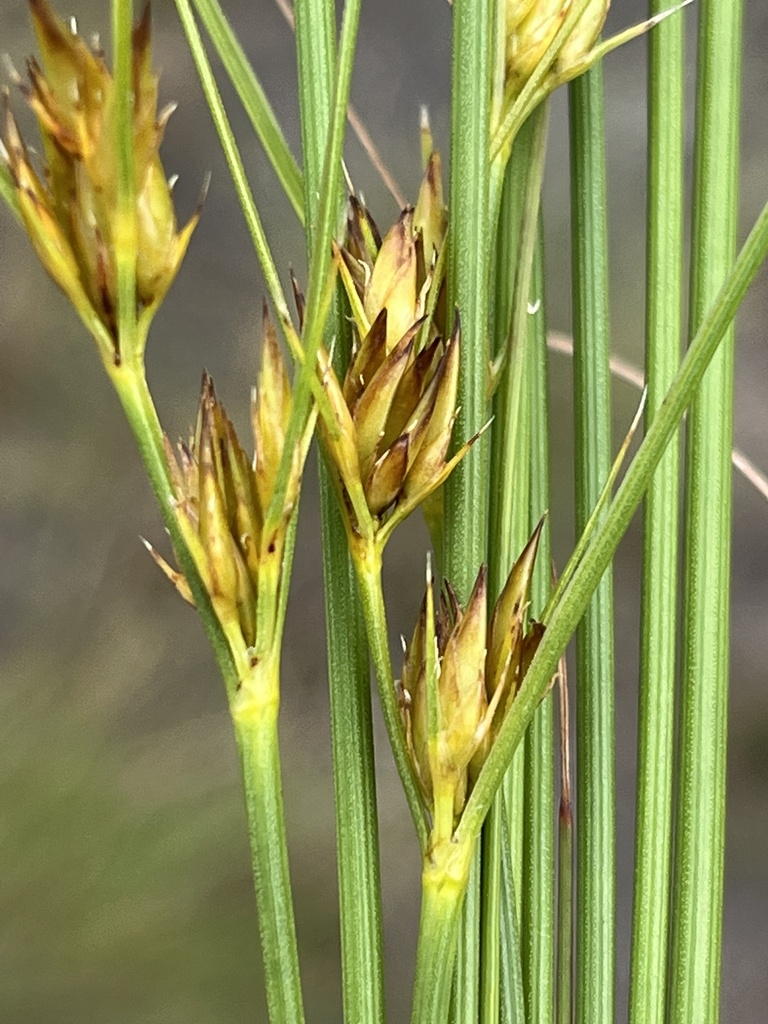
Young flowering heads

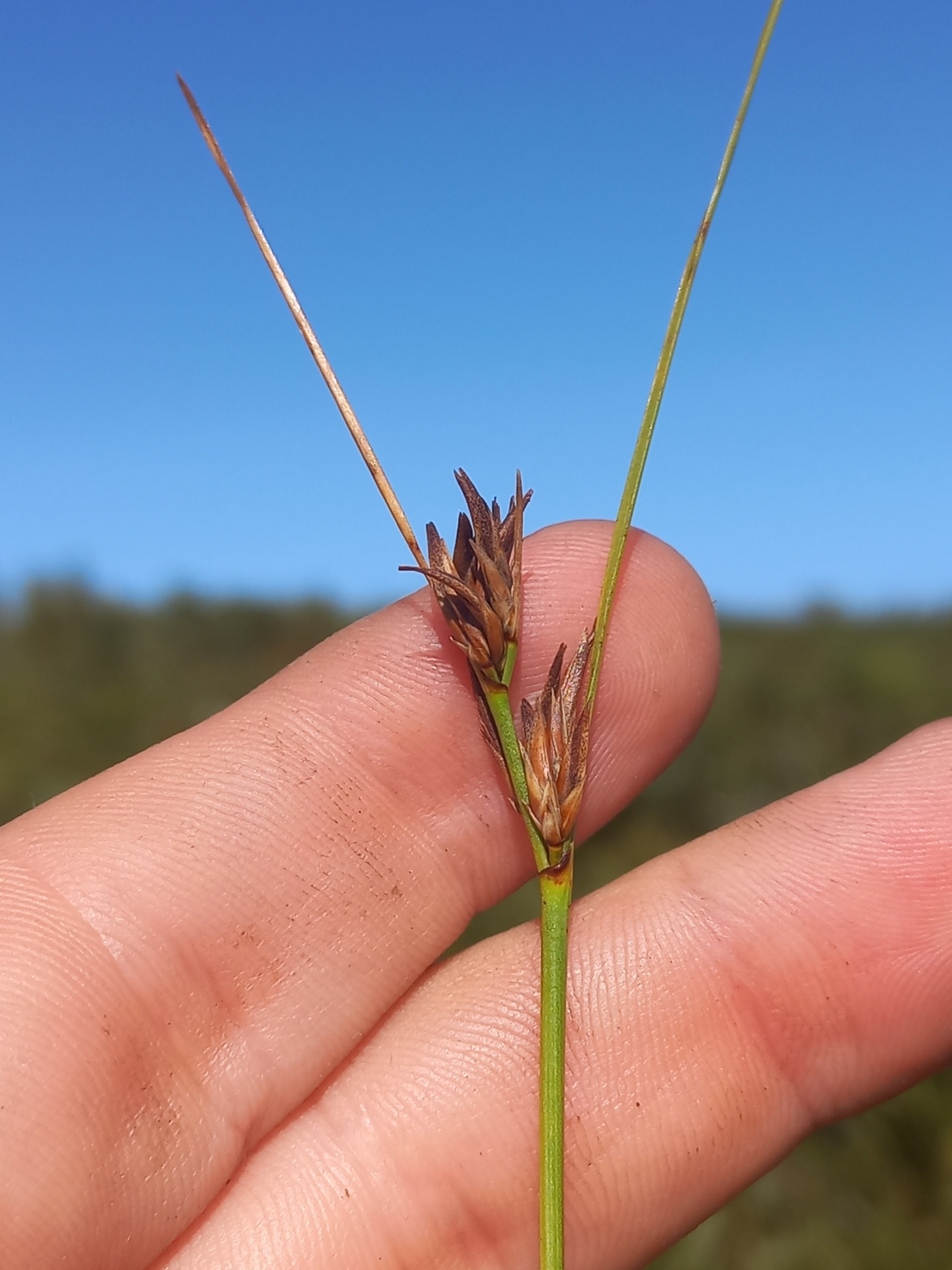
Flowering head

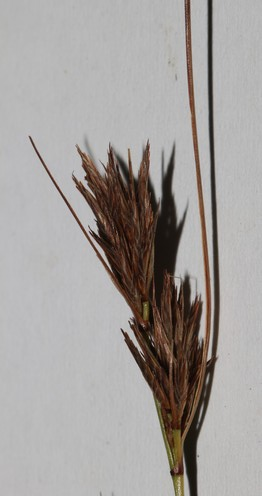
Flowering head
