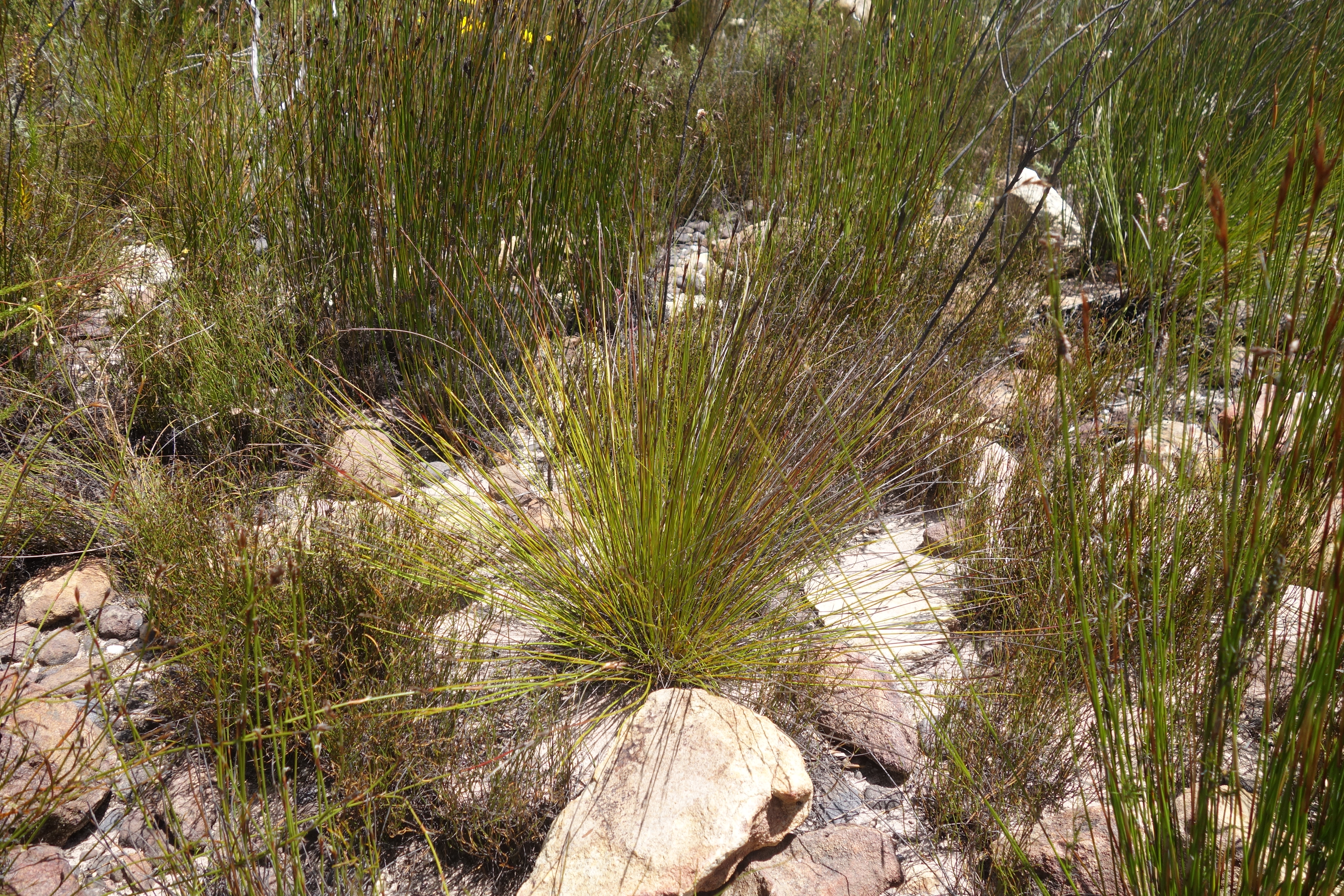
- Eared Veldrush

Scientific classification
- Kingdom: Plantae
- Clade: Tracheophytes
- Clade: Angiosperms
- Clade: Monocots
- Clade: Commelinids
- Order: Poales
- Family: Cyperaceae
- Genus: Schoenus
- Species: S. pseudoloreus

Binomial name
- Schoenus pseudoloreus (Kük.) T.L.Elliott & Muasya
- Documented collection localities in South Africa

Synonyms
- Tetraria sylvatica var. pseudolorea Kük.

= Schoenus pseudoloreus =

Species of grass-like plant

Schoenus pseudoloreus is a species of sedge endemic to the Western Cape and Northern Cape provinces of South Africa. Its range also reaches the western border of Eastern Cape Province.

== Diagnostic characters ==
The key diagnostic characters of S. pseudoloreus are its narrowly contracted flowering heads with bracts having small ear-like membranaceous extensions that cover the base of each spike. The spikelets of S. pseudoloreus often have firm glumes, as in Schoenus compar and Schoenus arenicola. The leaves of S. pseudoloreus are usually terete (round) and the leaf sheaths are red in colour, except in northern variants that tend to be overall lighter in colour. In addition, the leaf sheaths and part of the flowering stems are often sticky.

Similar to other sedges, plants in this group are very difficult to identify. It appears that part of this problem is caused by the tendency of the southern African Schoenus to form hybrids with each other. Preliminary evidence suggests that there might be hybridization in S. pseudoloreus.

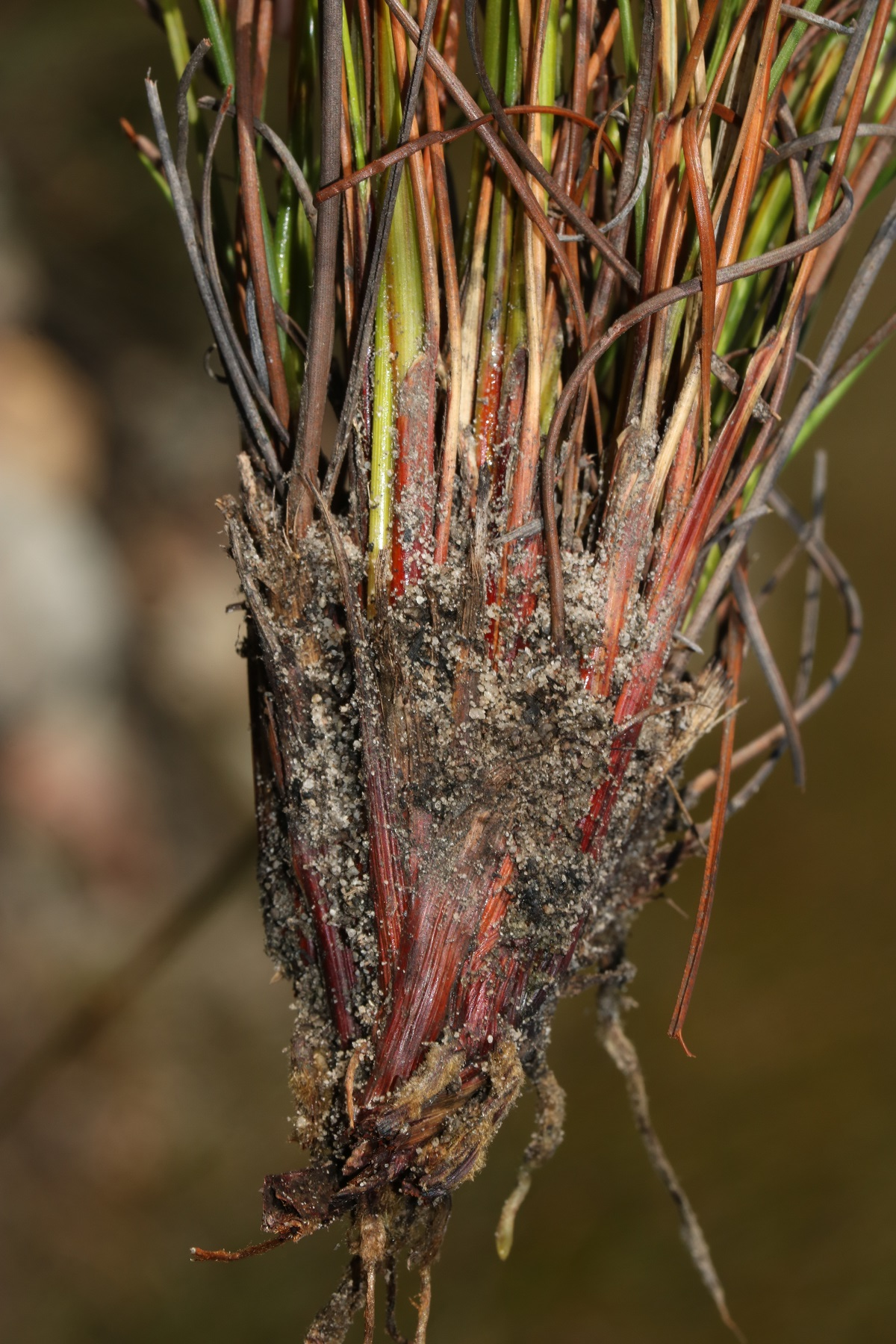
Base of culms

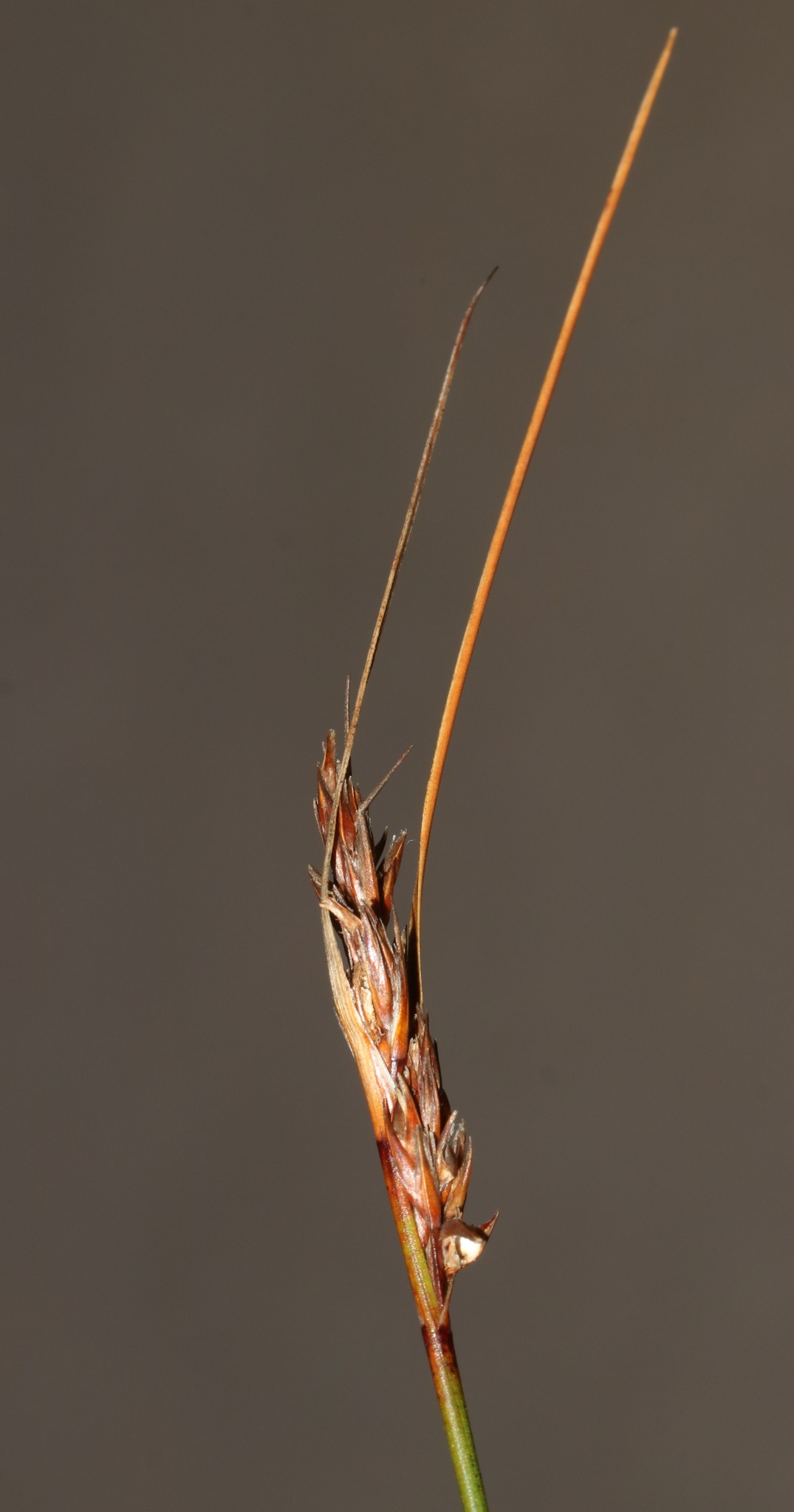
Flowering head

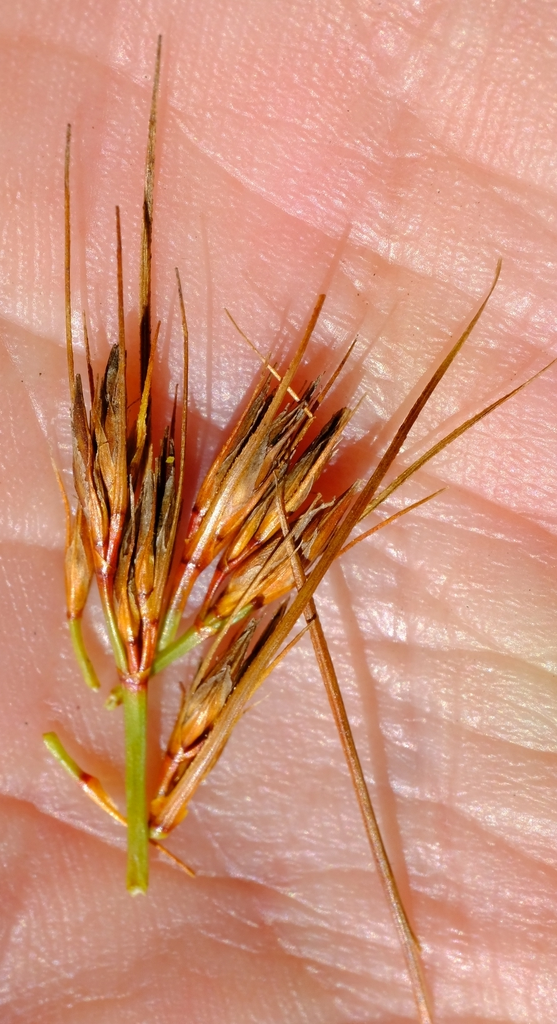
Flowering spikes

Spikelet

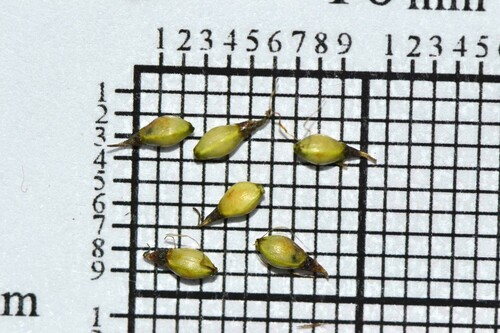
Nutlets

== Taxonomy ==
Schoenus pseudoloreus is a species in family Cyperaceae, tribe Schoeneae. Other notable genera in tribe Schoeneae include Lepidosperma, Oreobolus, Costularia, Tetraria and Gahnia. The most closely related species to S. pseudoloreus are other southern African Schoenus species, specifically, species in the Schoenus compar – Schoenus pictus group.

Southern African Schoenus were once classified as Tetraria; however, based on molecular and morphological differences, we now know that the two groups are evolutionary distinct. To ensure that this group of sedges is monophyletic (i.e. the genus only has closely related species), several species of Epischoenus and the southern African Tetraria were transferred into Schoenus. In the field, the southern African Schoenus can be distinguished from Tetraria species by their lack of stem leaves and the absence of reticulate sheaths at the bases of the flowering stems.

== Distribution and ecology ==
The known distribution of S. pseudoloreus ranges as far north as the Kamiesberg in the Northern Cape Province and near Willowmore in the east. It is a species usually found on dry mountain slopes with varying substrates.

== Images ==
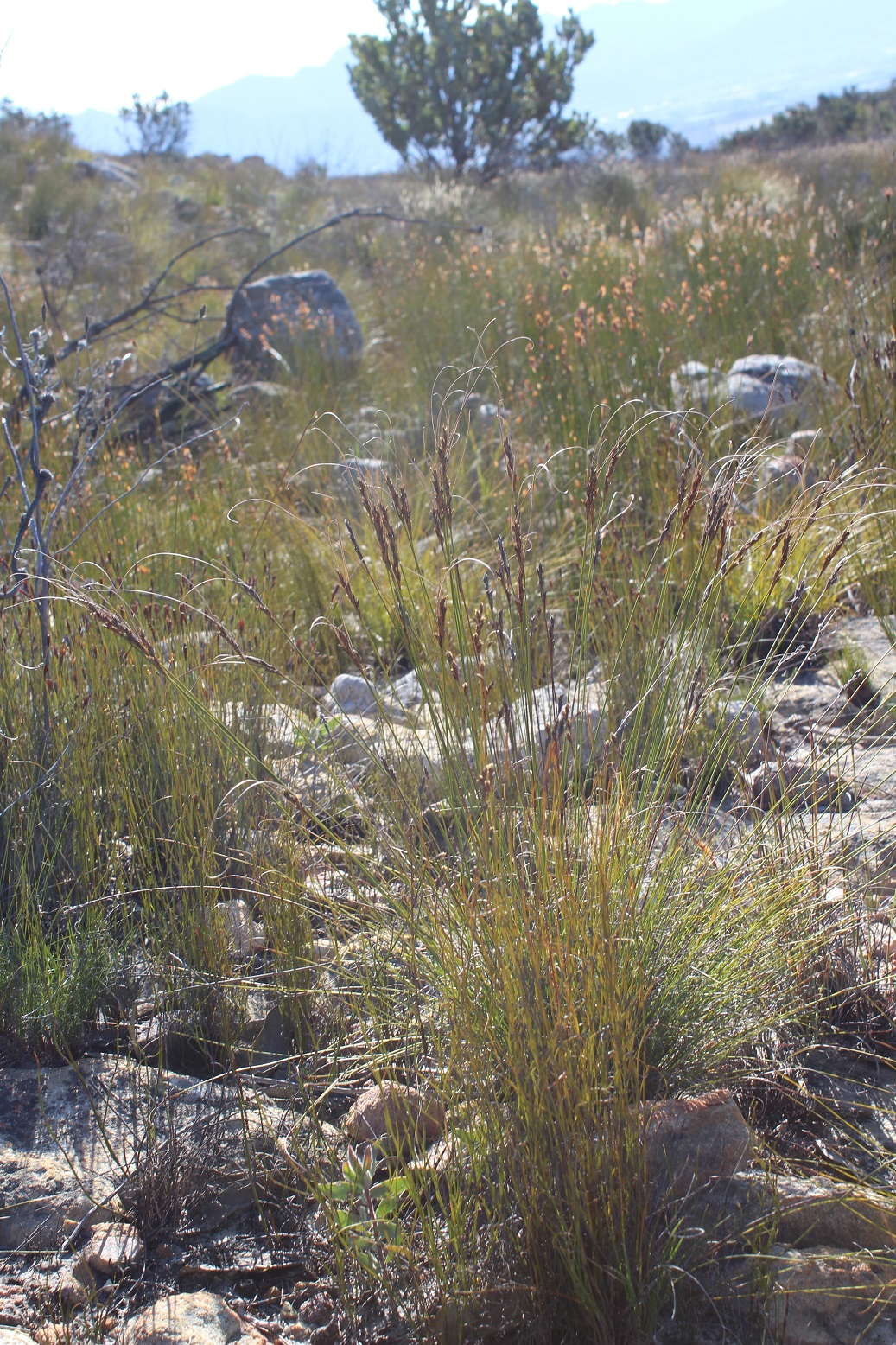
Growth form

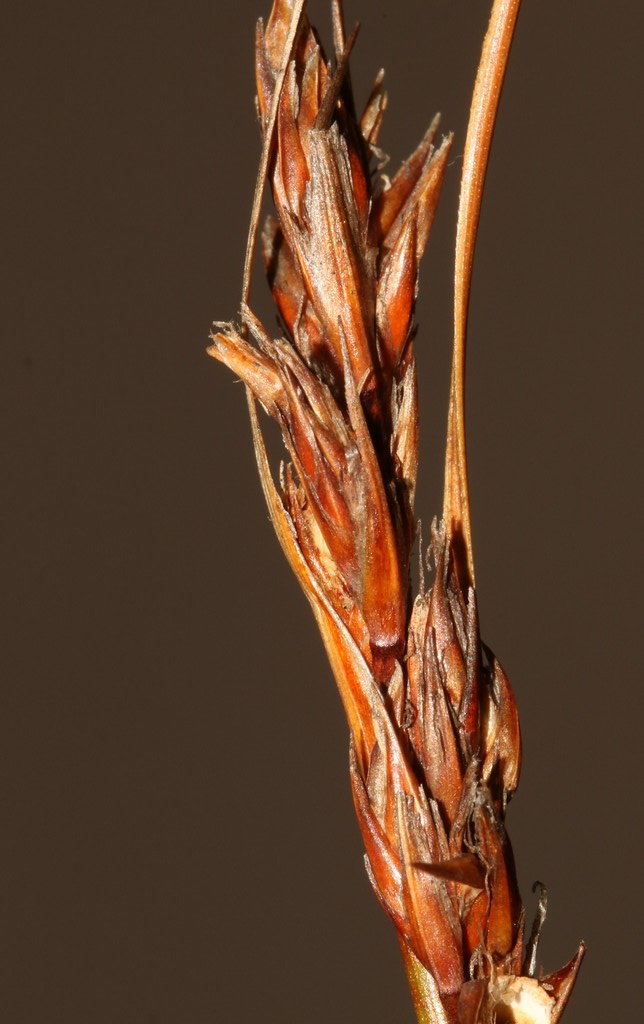
Flowering head

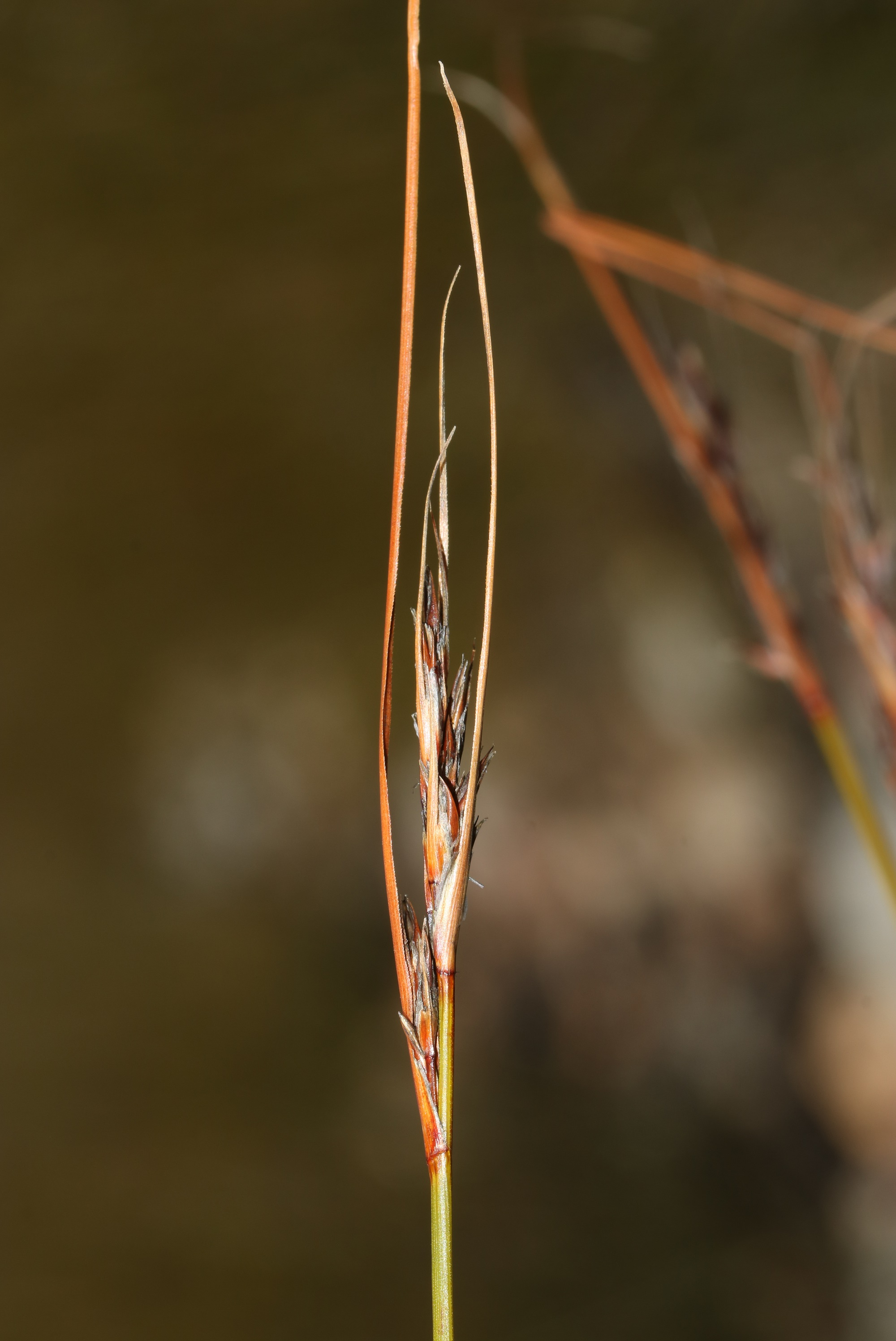
Flowering head

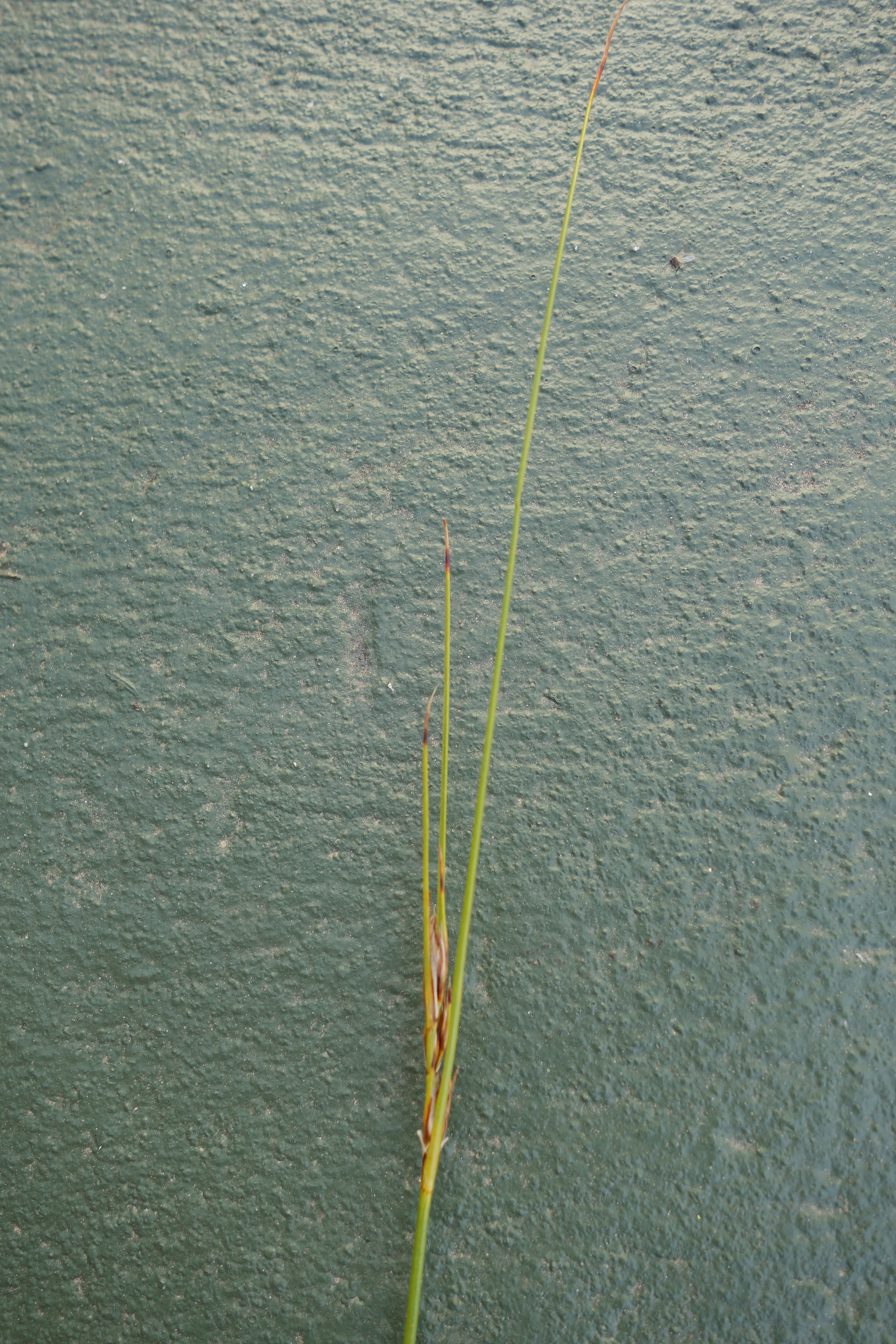
Flowering head

Nutlet
