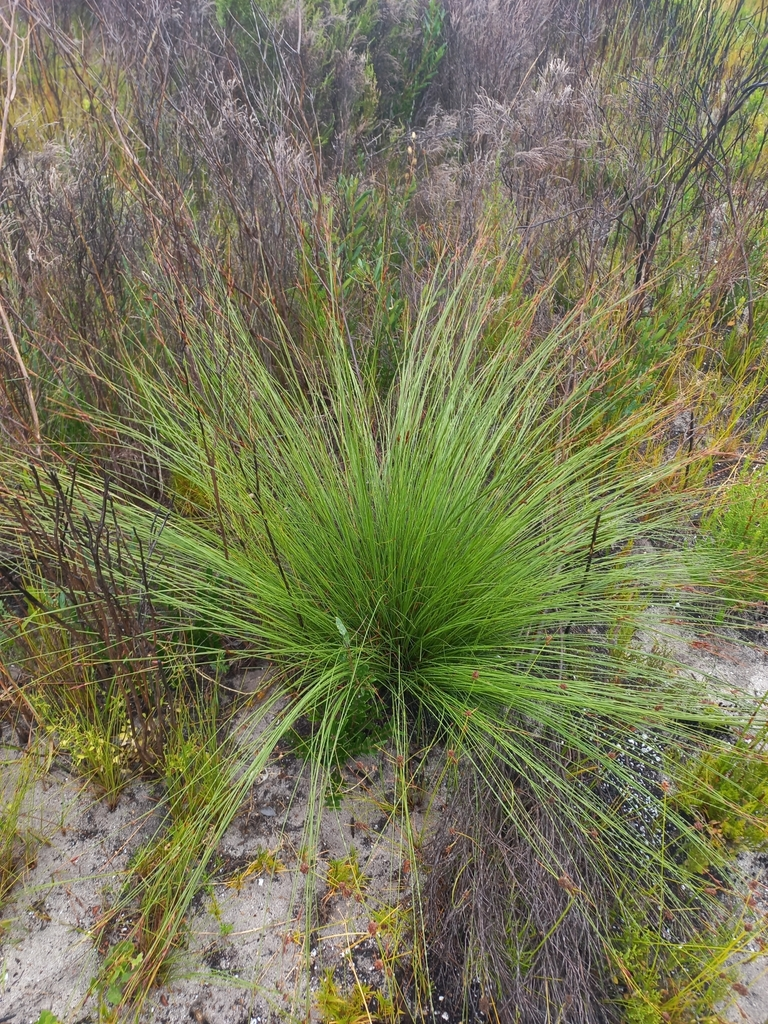
- Sand veldrush

Scientific classification
- Kingdom: Plantae
- Clade: Tracheophytes
- Clade: Angiosperms
- Clade: Monocots
- Clade: Commelinids
- Order: Poales
- Family: Cyperaceae
- Genus: Schoenus
- Species: S. arenicola

Binomial name
- Schoenus arenicola T.L.Elliott & Muasya
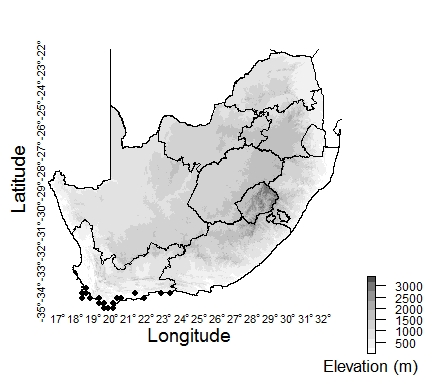
- Documented collection localities in South Africa

Synonyms
- Tetraria brachyphylla Levyns; Tetraria sylvatica var. pseudocuspidata Kük.

= Schoenus arenicola =

Species of grass-like plant

Schoenus arenicola is a species of sedge endemic to the south-west coast of South Africa.

== Description ==
Key diagnostic characters of this sand-loving species include reddish-brown leaf sheaths and relatively narrow flowering heads (inflorescences) with generally three to six spikelets. The leaves of this species are usually less than half the length of the culm and the nutlet beak is continuous with the body of the nutlet.

Schoenus arenicola is most similar to Schoenus compar; however, the former species has shorter leaves and reddish-brown leaf sheaths compared to the longer leaves and ivory leaf sheaths of S. compar.

Similar to other sedges, plants in this group are very difficult to identify. It appears that part of this problem is caused by the tendency of the southern African Schoenus to form hybrids with each other. However, hybridization is yet to be observed in S. arenicola.

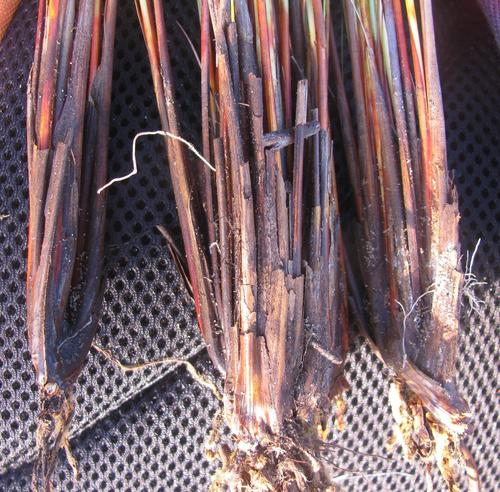
Bases of flowering stems (culms)

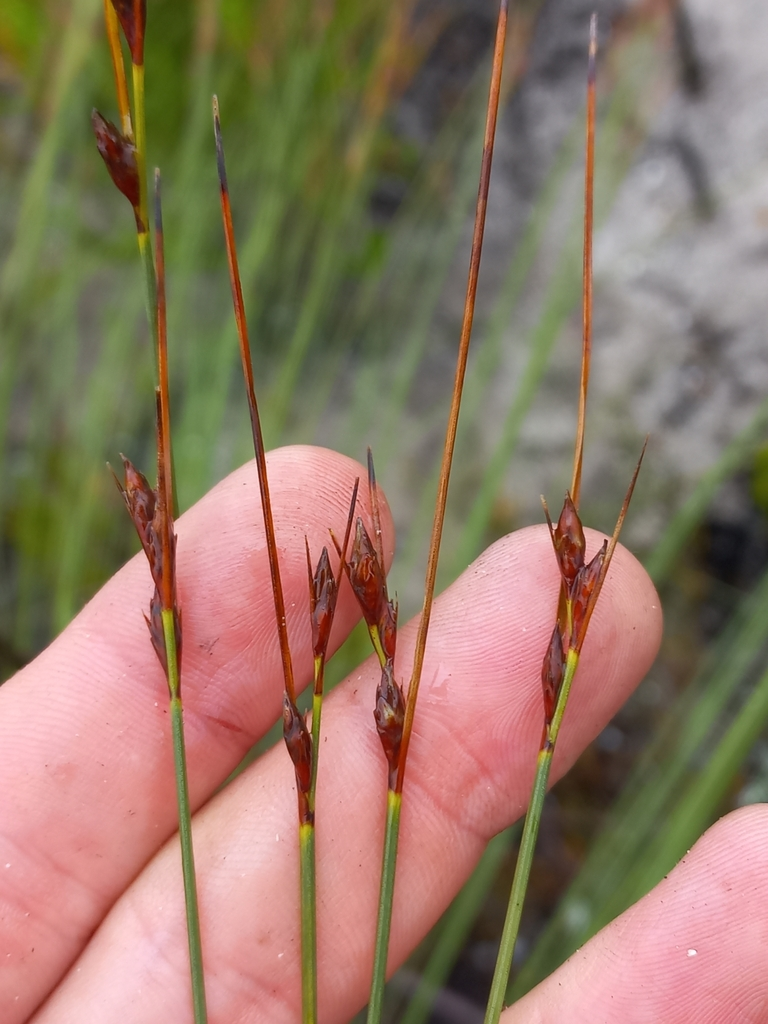
Flowering heads (inflorescences)

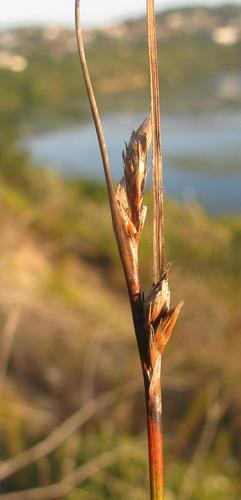
Flowering head

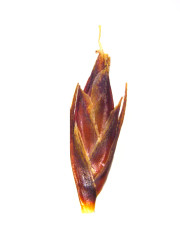
Spikelet

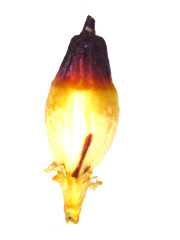
Nutlet

== Taxonomy ==
Schoenus arenicola is a species of flowering plant in the family Cyperaceae, tribe Schoeneae. Other genera in tribe Schoeneae include Lepidosperma, Oreobolus, Costularia, Tetraria and Gahnia.

Southern African Schoenus were once classified as Tetraria; however, based on molecular and morphological differences, the two groups are considered evolutionary distinct. To ensure that this group of sedges is monophyletic (i.e. the genus only has closely related species), several species of Epischoenus and the southern African Tetraria were transferred into Schoenus. In the field, the southern African Schoenus can be distinguished from Tetraria species by their lack of stem leaves and the absence of reticulate sheaths at the bases of the flowering stems.

Closely related species include the Schoenus compar - Schoenus pictus group.

== Distribution and ecology ==
Schoenus arenicola mostly occurs near the south-western coast of South Africa, ranging from the Knysna area in the east to the Cape Peninsula in the west. This species usually grows among fynbos vegetation at low elevations on well-drained sandy sites.

== Images ==
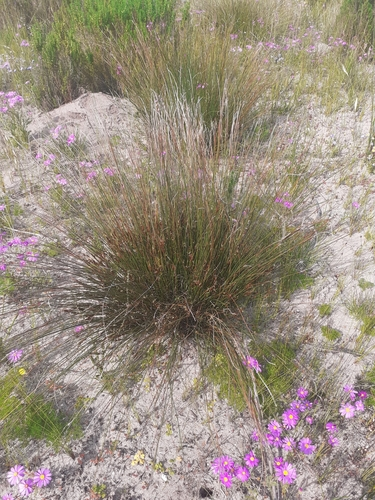
Growth form of Schoenus arenicola

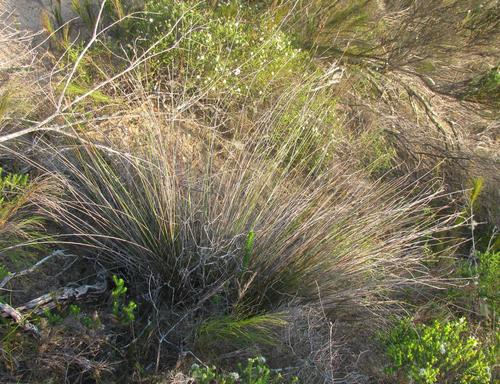
Growth form of Schoenus arenicola

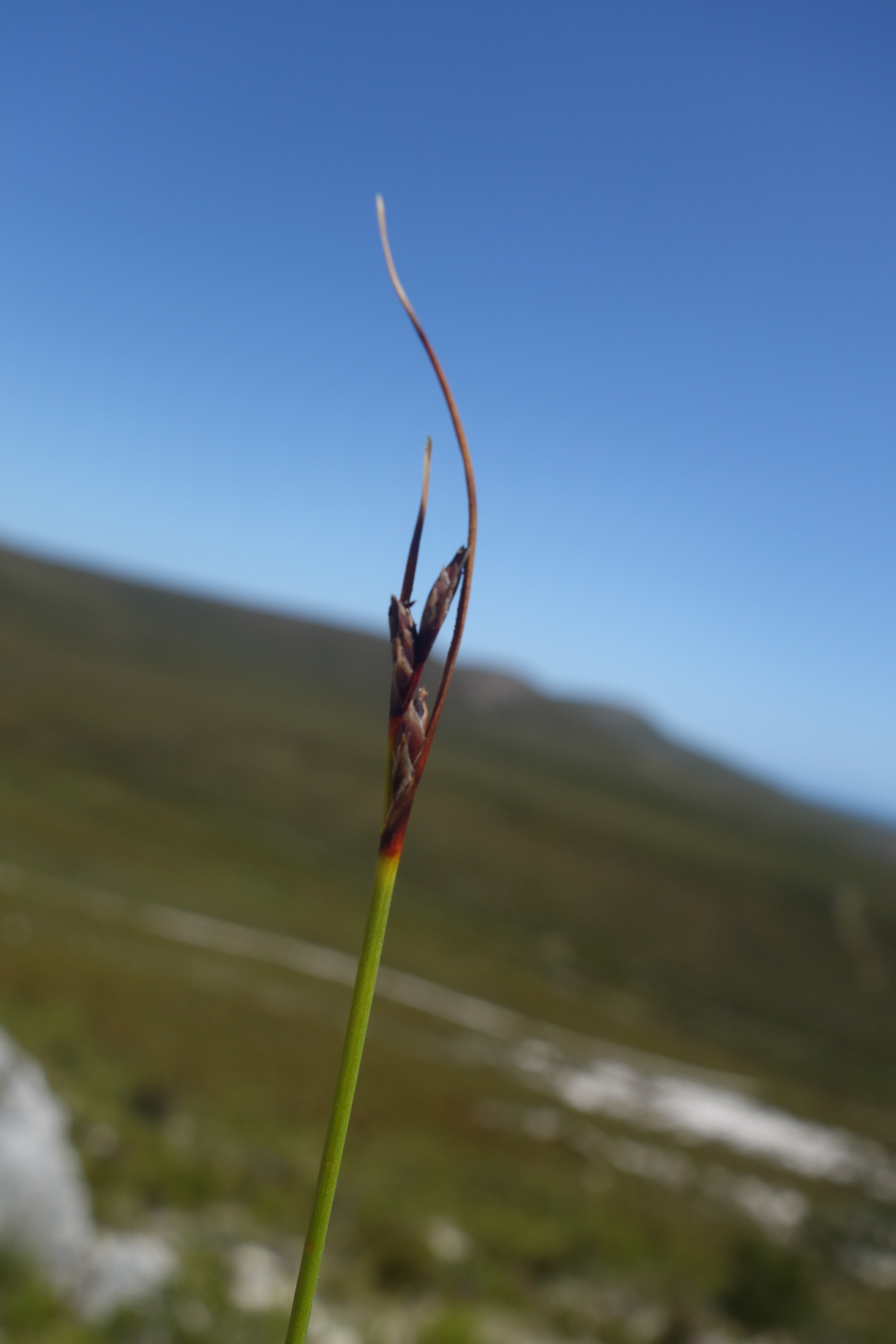
Flowering head (inflorescence)

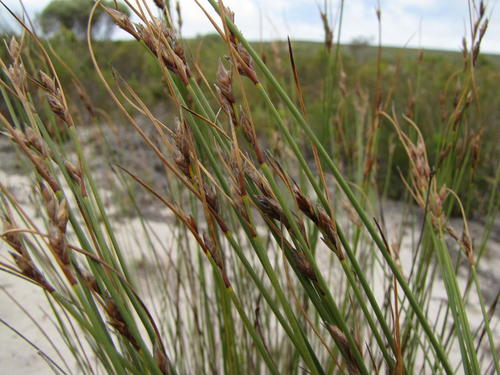
Flowering heads
