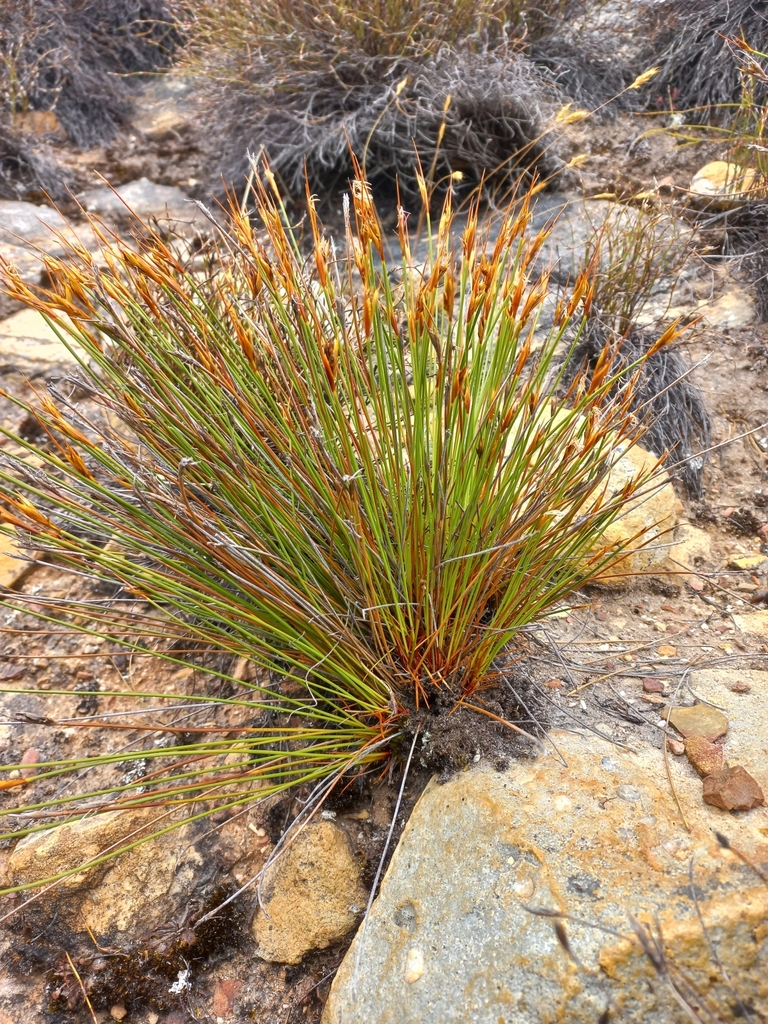
- Yellow veldrush

Scientific classification
- Kingdom: Plantae
- Clade: Tracheophytes
- Clade: Angiosperms
- Clade: Monocots
- Clade: Commelinids
- Order: Poales
- Family: Cyperaceae
- Genus: Schoenus
- Species: S. pictus

Binomial name
- Schoenus pictus (Boeckeler) Kuntze
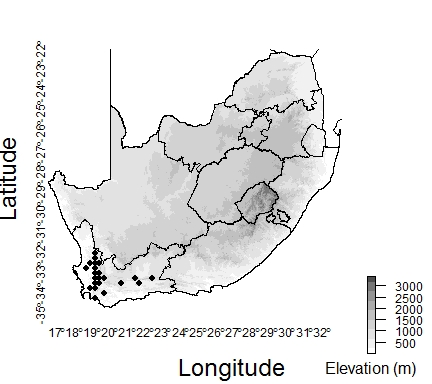
- Documented collection localities in South Africa

Synonyms
- Elynanthus pictus Boeckeler; Tetraria picta (Boeckeler) C.B.Clarke

= Schoenus pictus =

Species of grass-like plant

Schoenus pictus is a species of sedge endemic to the Western Cape Province of South Africa. It is a species usually found on mountain slopes.

== Diagnostic characters ==
Key diagnostic characters of S. pictus are its relatively firm and thick bracts that surrounding the flower clusters (spikes). These bracts are often yellow-brown in colour in young plants and they envelop the spikes. In addition, the leaf sheaths and part of the flowering stems are usually sticky.

The prominent bracts surrounding the spikes combined with the sticky (viscous) leaf bases distinguish S. pictus from other Southern African Schoenus species.

Similar to other sedges, plants in this group are very difficult to identify. It appears that part of this problem is caused by the tendency of the southern African Schoenus to form hybrids with each other. However, hybridization is yet to be observed in S. pictus.

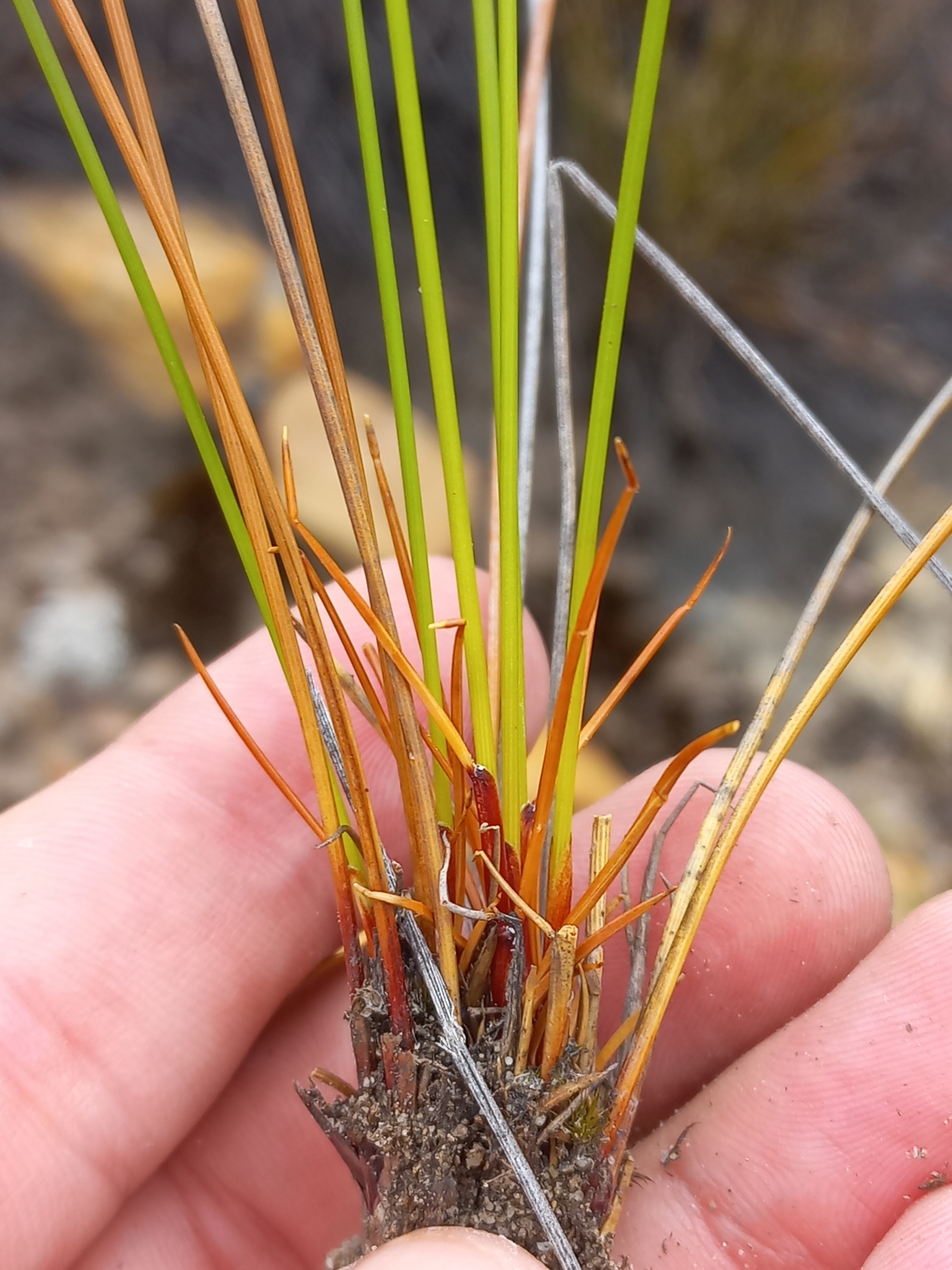
Bases of flowering stems (culms)

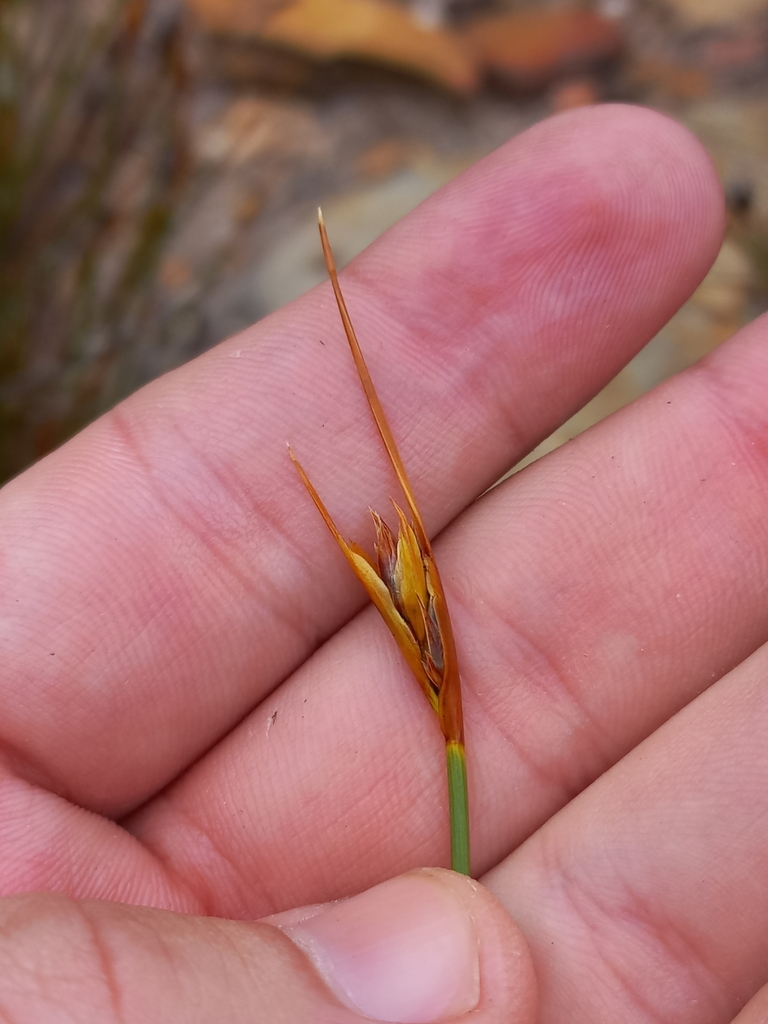
Flowering head (inflorescence)

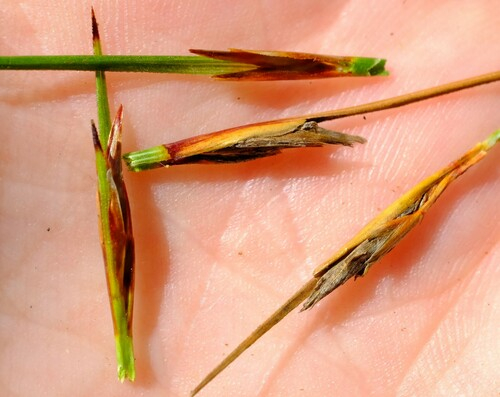
Inflorescences

Spikelet

Nutlet

== Taxonomy ==
Schoenus pictus is a species in family Cyperaceae, tribe Schoeneae. Other notable genera in tribe Schoeneae include Lepidosperma, Oreobolus, Costularia, Tetraria and Gahnia. The most closely related species to S. pictus are other southern African Schoenus species, specifically, species in the Schoenus compar - Schoenus pictus group.

Southern African Schoenus were once classified as Tetraria; however, based on molecular and morphological differences, we now know that the two groups are evolutionary distinct. To ensure that this group of sedges is monophyletic (i.e. the genus only has closely related species), several species of Epischoenus and the southern African Tetraria were transferred into Schoenus. In the field, the southern African Schoenus can be distinguished from Tetraria species by their lack of stem leaves and the absence of reticulate sheaths at the bases of the flowering stems.

== Distribution and ecology ==
Schoenus pictus grows throughout the western mountains of the Western Cape Province of South Africa. Most reports of this species are from high mountain slopes surrounded by fynbos vegetation, often from damp sites.

== Images ==
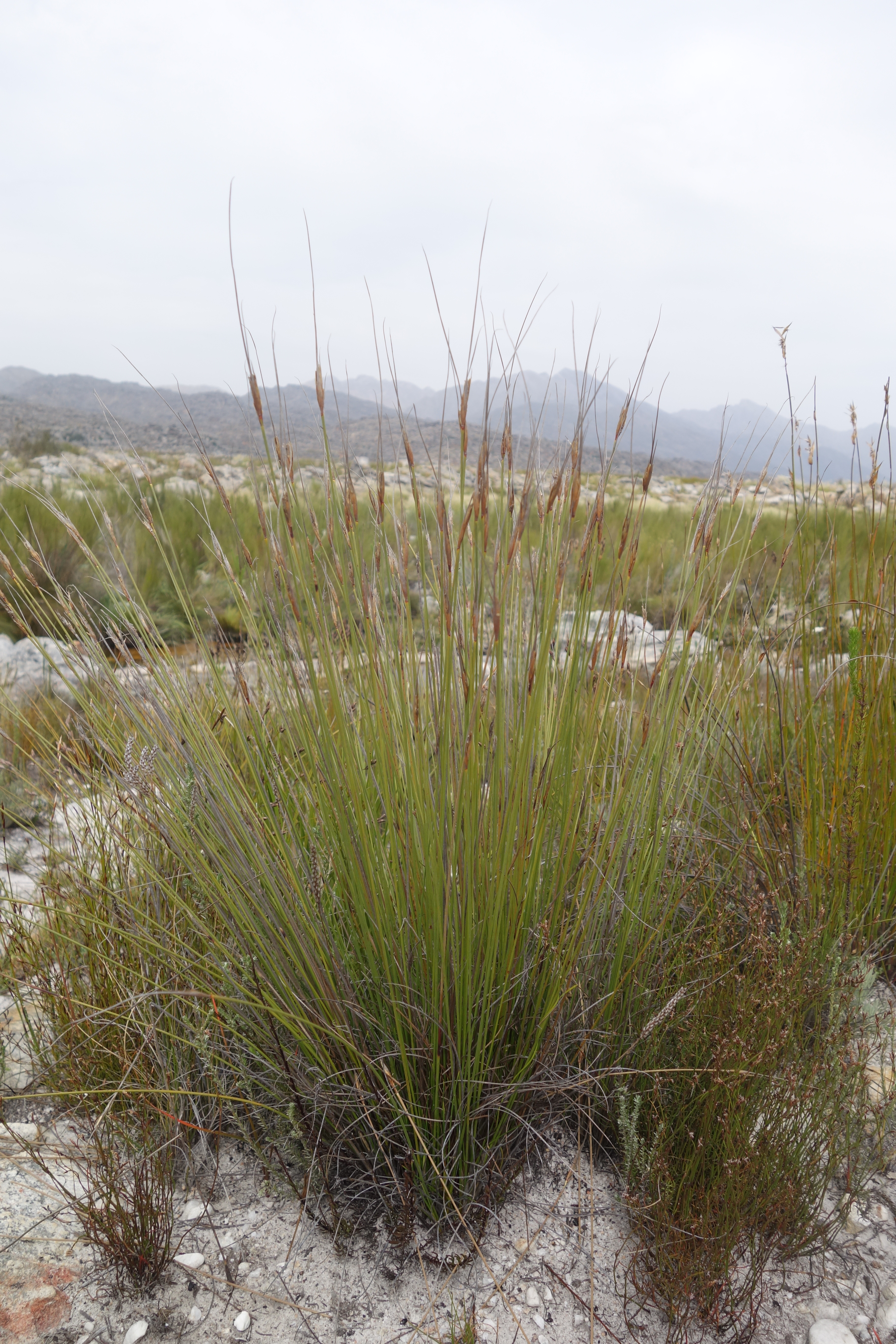
Growth form

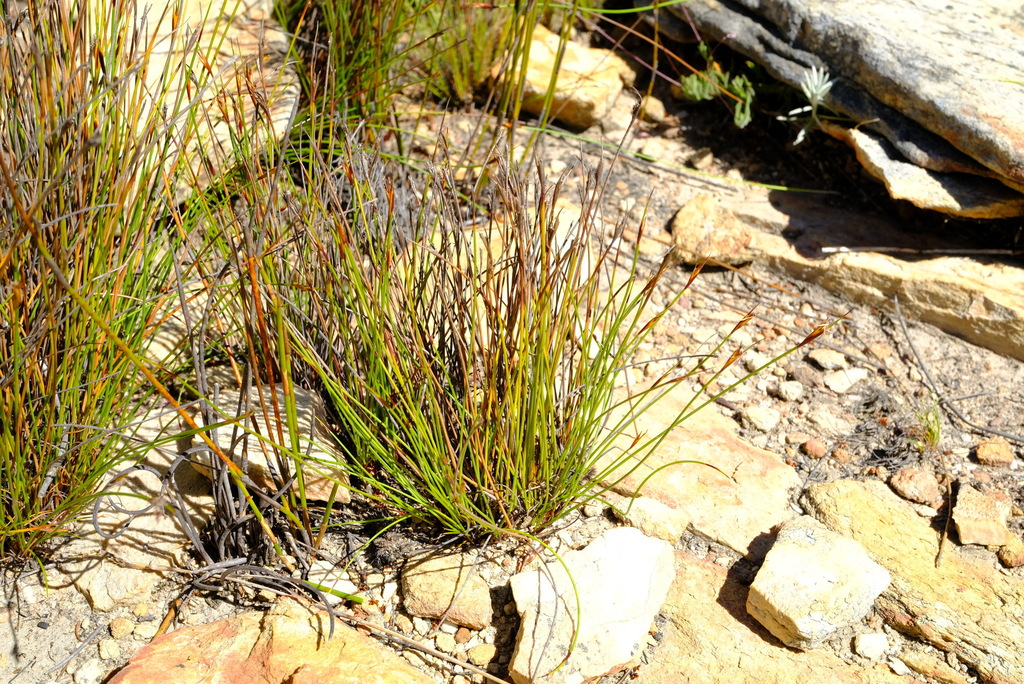
Growth form

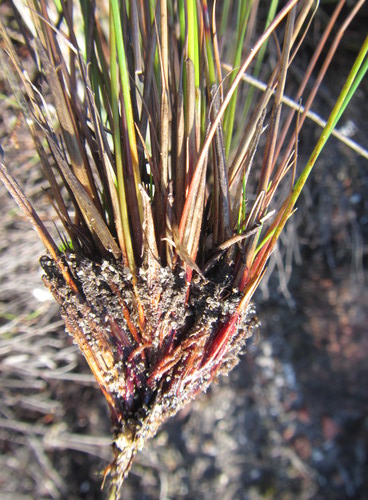
Bases of flowering stems (culms)

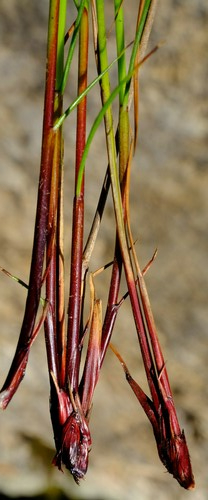
Bases of flowering stems (culms)

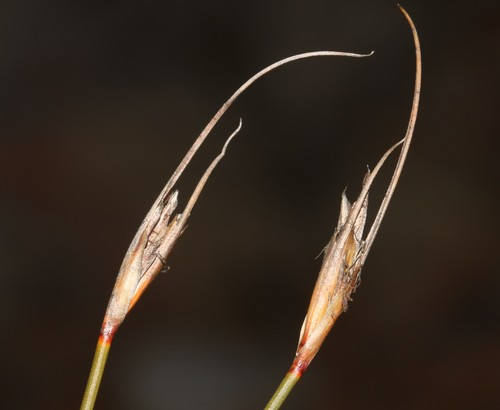
Flowering heads

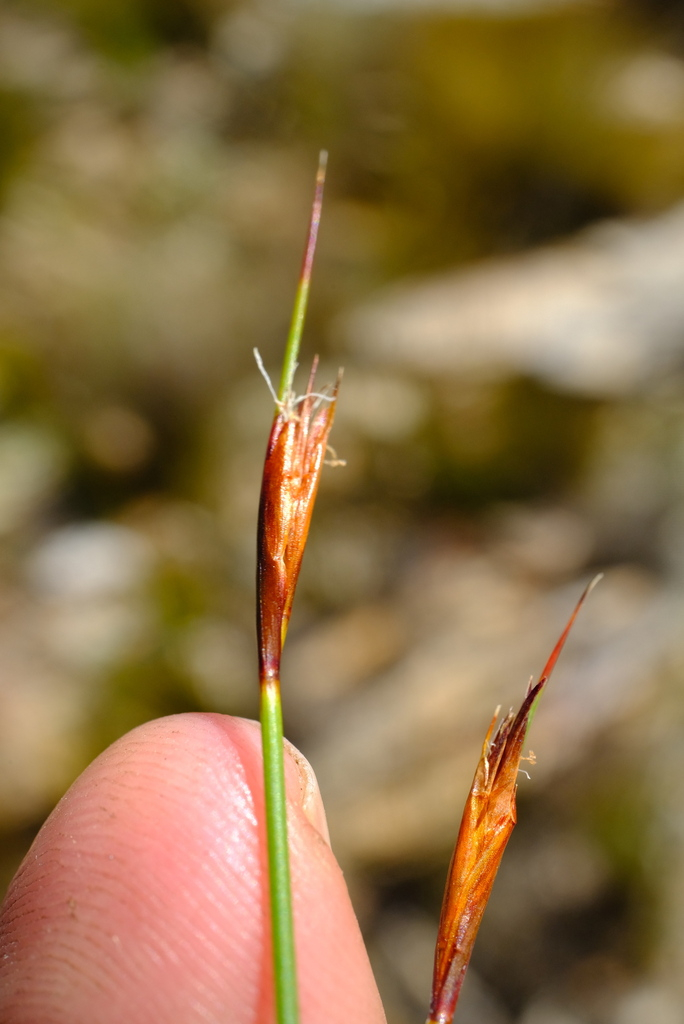
Flowering heads

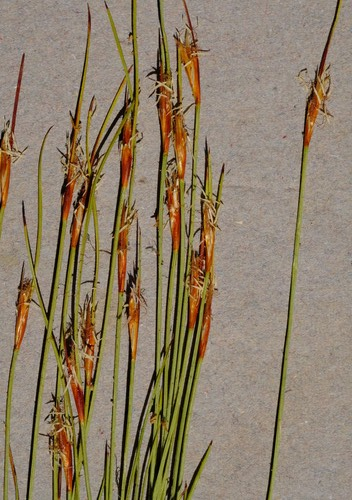
Flowering heads

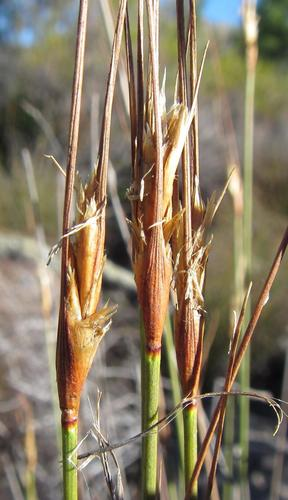
Flowering heads

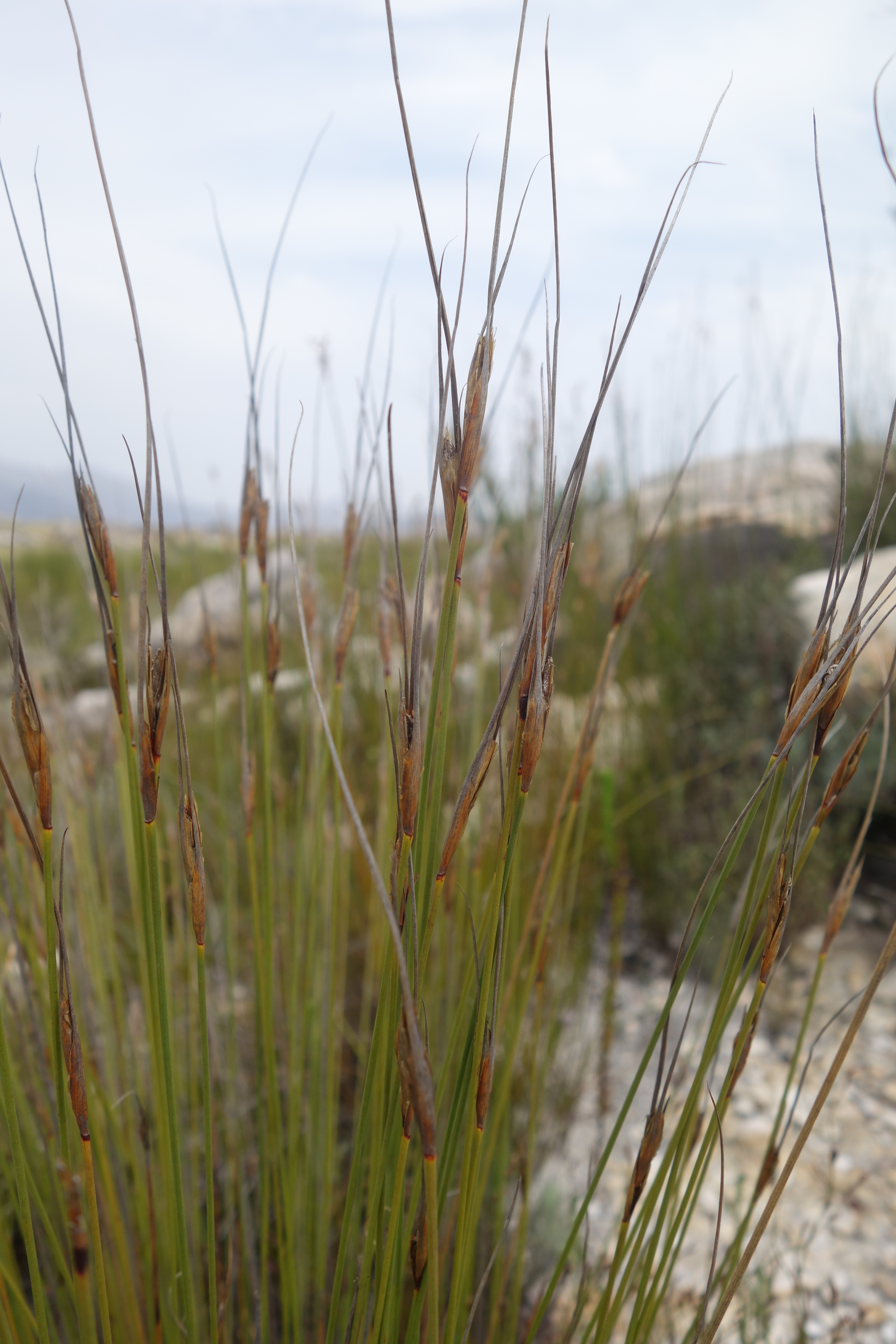
Flowering heads

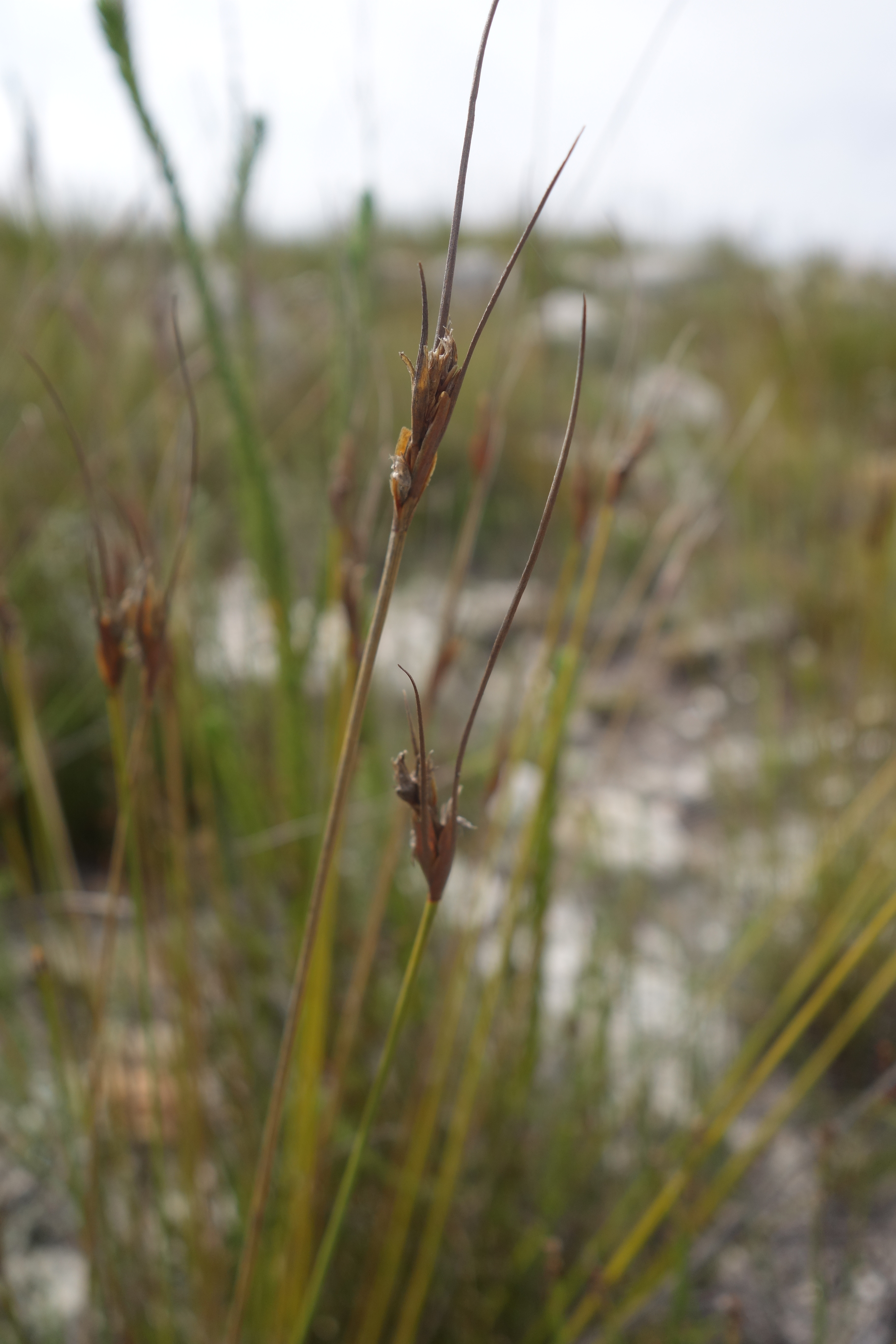
Flowering heads

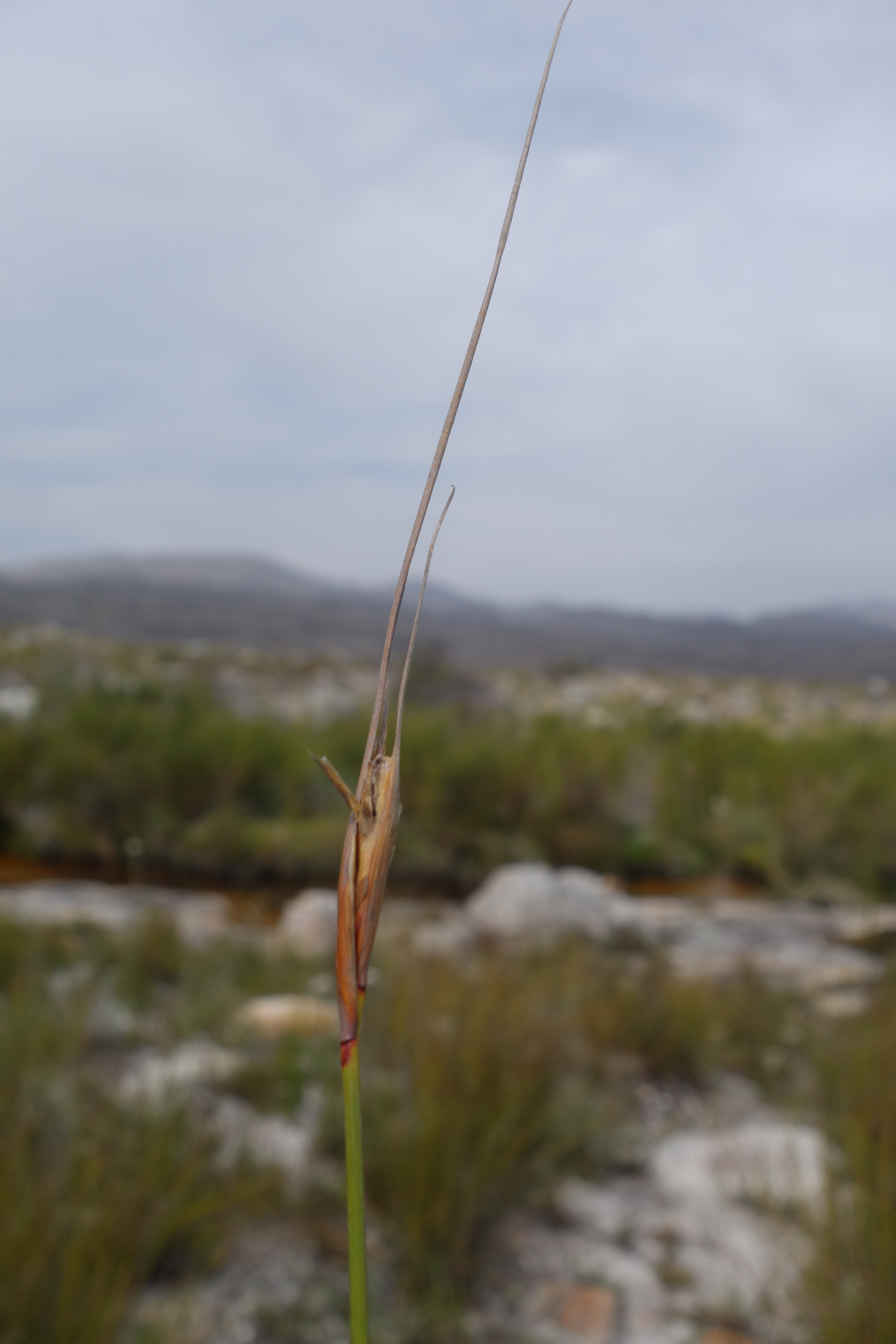
Flowering head

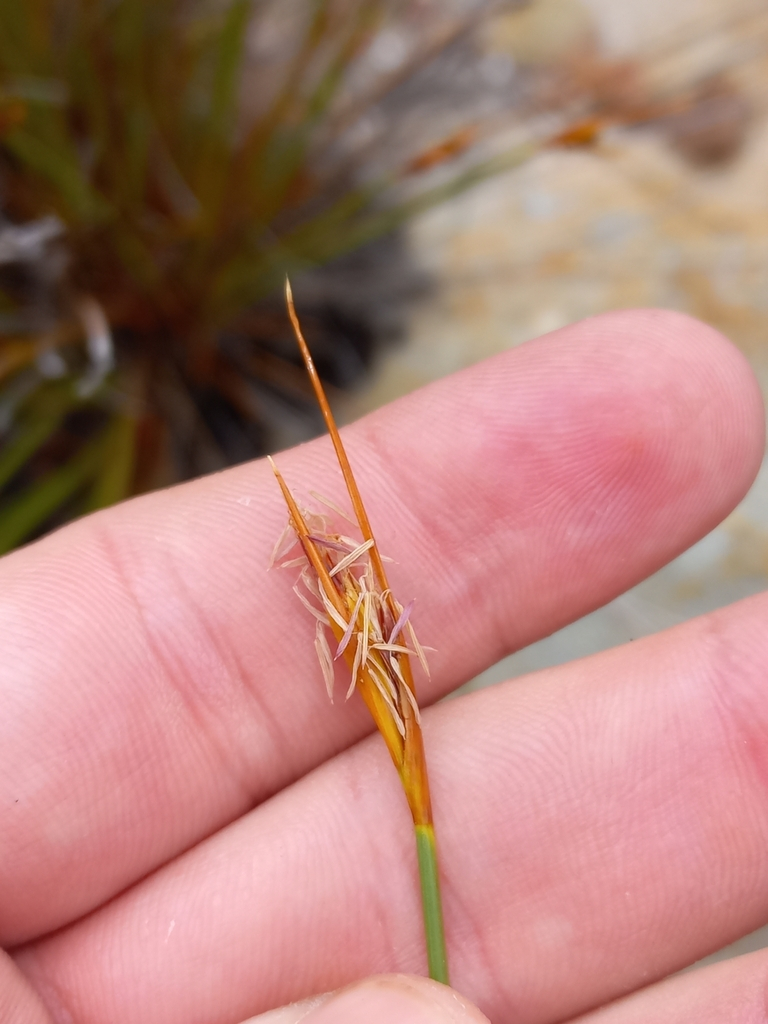
Flowering head with stamens
