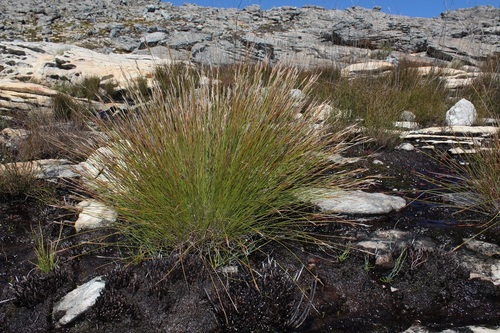
- Slim veldrush

Scientific classification
- Kingdom: Plantae
- Clade: Tracheophytes
- Clade: Angiosperms
- Clade: Monocots
- Clade: Commelinids
- Order: Poales
- Family: Cyperaceae
- Genus: Schoenus
- Species: S. dregeanus

Binomial name
- Schoenus dregeanus (Boeckeler) Kuntze
- Documented collection localities in South Africa

Synonyms
- Elynanthus dregeanus Boeckeler; Tetraria dregeana (Boeckeler) C.B.Clarke; Epischoenus dregeanus (Boeckeler) Levyns

= Schoenus dregeanus =

Species of grass-like plant

Schoenus dregeanus is a species of sedge endemic to mountainous locations in south-western South Africa.

== Description ==
Schoenus dregeanus is a species of southern African Schoenus displaying characters of the Epischoenus, Schoenus cuspidatus and allies, as well as the Schoenus compar - Schoenus pictus and allies groups. The presence of leaves (often over 30 mm long) along the lower parts of the flowering stems (culms) differentiates this species from others in the Epischoenus group; however, the last internode of the spikelets are elongated, similar to other species in that group. In addition to intermediate morphological characteristics, evolutionary studies often show that S. dregeanus is placed outside of the Epischoenus group of Schoenus and not embedded within the clade.

The nutlets (fruits) of S. dregeanus are rough at the base and apex, which differs from the entirely matted or shiny nutlets characteristic of other species in the Epischoenus group, such as those of Schoenus gracillimus and Schoenus lucidus.

Similar to Schoenus ligulatus, S. dregeanus has linear spikelets. However, the spikelets of S. ligulatus have prophylls (bracts) at their base, whereas those of S. dregeanus lack this structure.

Although S. dregeanus and S. gracillimus sometimes morphologically resemble each other and their distributions overlap, the spikelets of S. gracillimus are often pendulous in this region.

The tendency of species in the southern African Schoenus to form hybrids with each other partially explains why they can be difficult to identify. Preliminary evidence suggests that S. dregeanus might form hybrids with other southern African Schoenus species, but this needs to be confirmed by further studies.

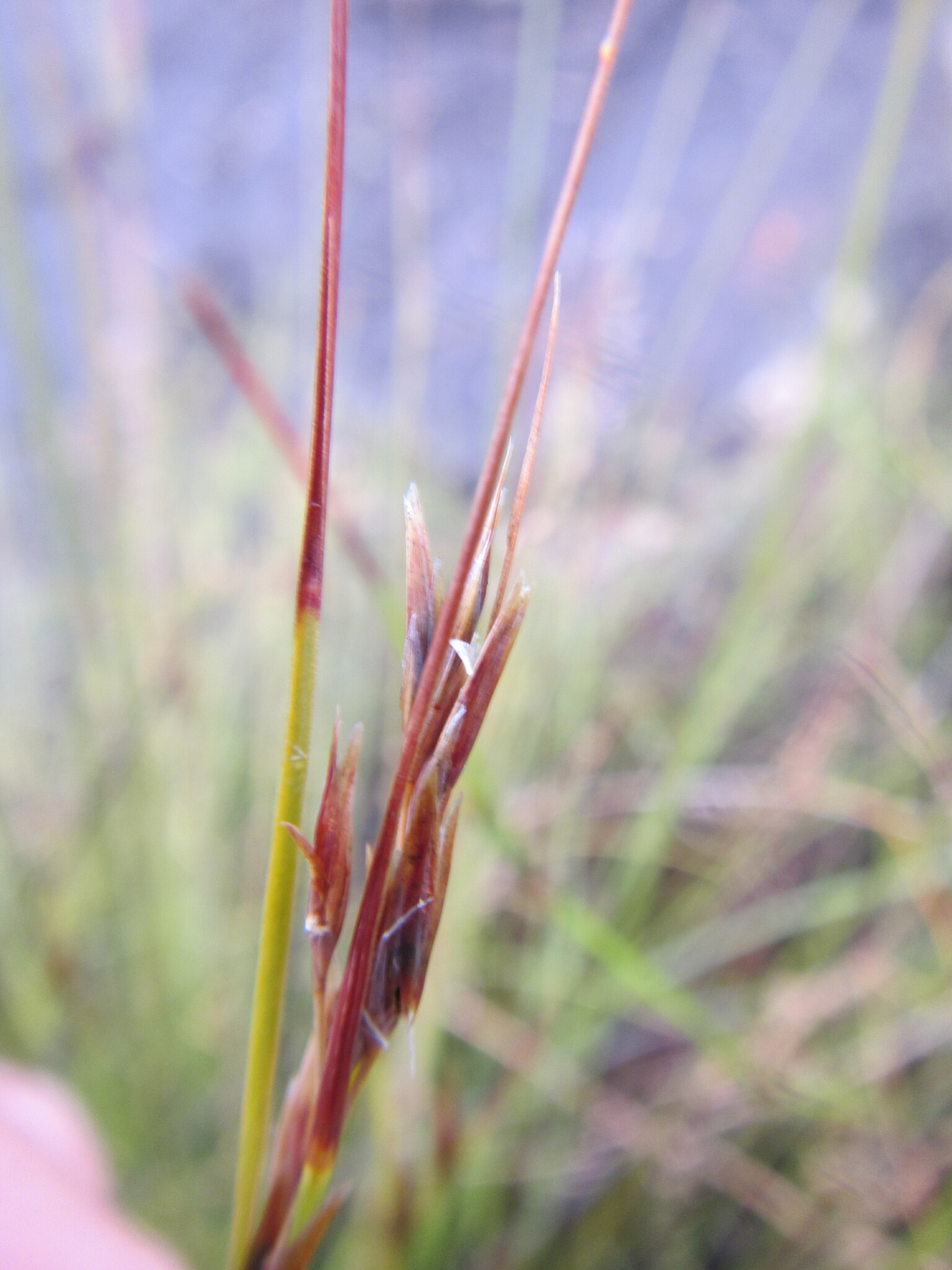
Flowering head

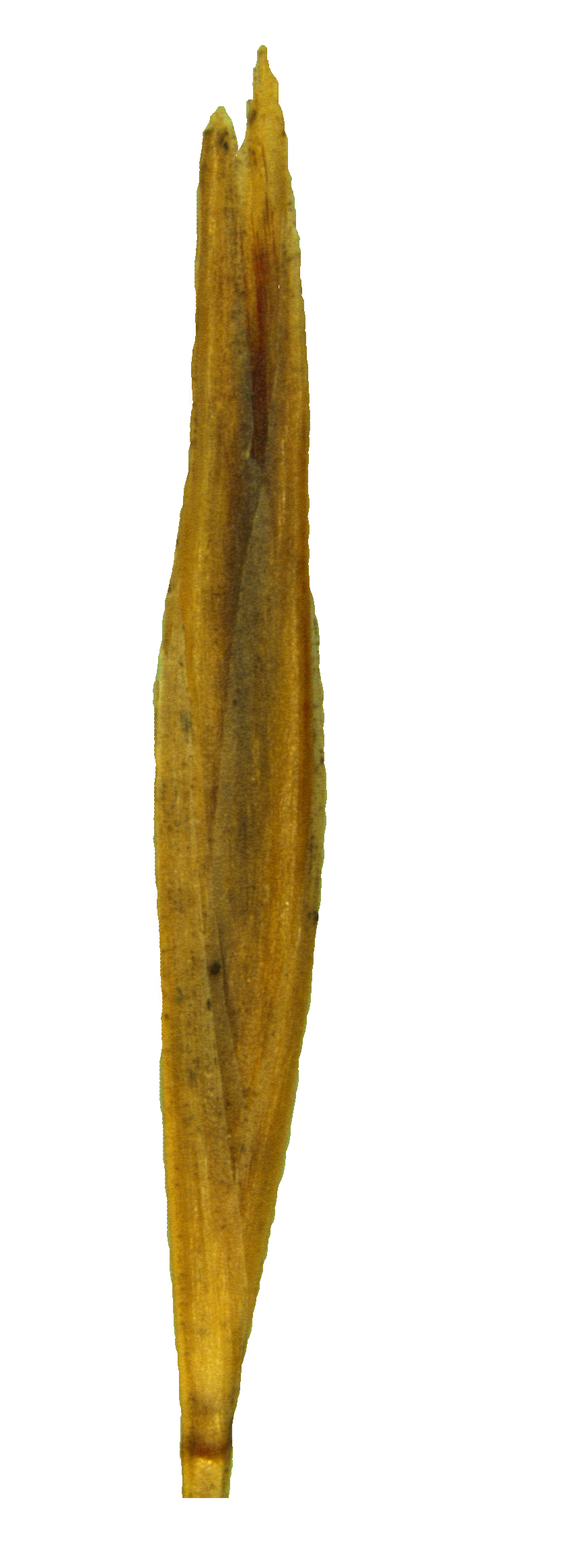
Spikelet

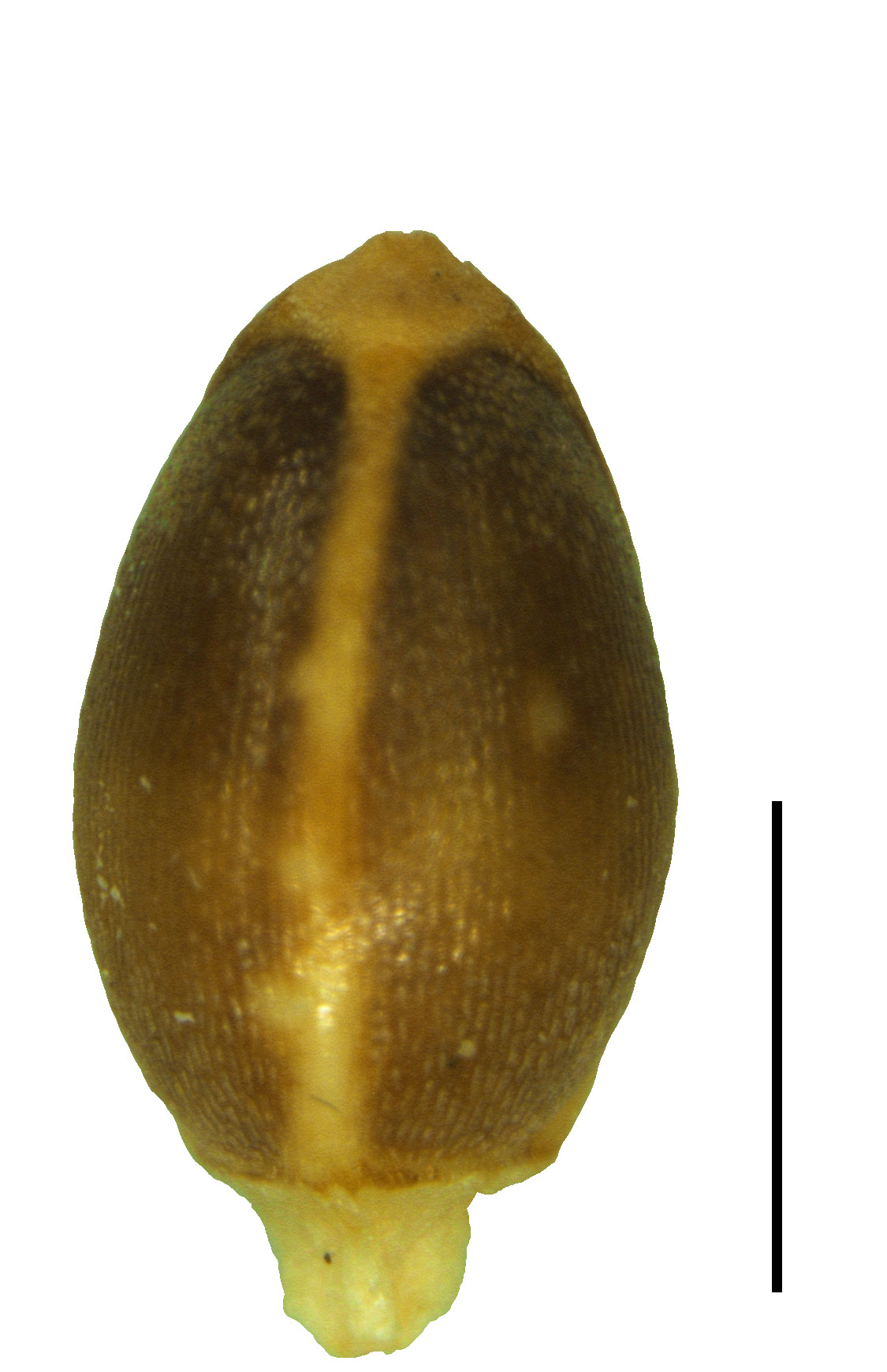
Nutlet (the black scale bar represents 1 mm)

== Taxonomy ==
Schoenus dregeanus is a species in family Cyperaceae, tribe Schoeneae. Other notable genera in tribe Schoeneae are Costularia, Gahnia, Lepidosperma, Oreobolus and Tetraria. Schoenus dregeanus is most closely related to other southern African Schoenus species, especially species in the Epischoenus group.

The genus Tetraria once included species from the southern African Schoenus; however, we now know that the two groups are evolutionary distinct based on molecular and morphological differences. To ensure that this group of sedges is monophyletic (i.e. the genus only has closely related species), several species of the southern African Tetraria and Epischoenus were transferred into Schoenus. The southern African Schoenus can be distinguished from Tetraria species in the field by their lack of stem leaves and the absence of reticulate sheaths at the bases of the flowering stems.

== Distribution and habitat ==
Schoenus dregeanus has been mostly observed from the Cederberg and Worcester areas of South Africa, with additional collections from the Riviersonderend Mountains and the Prince Albert region. This species tends to occur on moist, mountainous habitats sites between 600 and 1400 metres in elevation, and it can sometimes dominate the vegetation in moist areas.

== Gallery ==
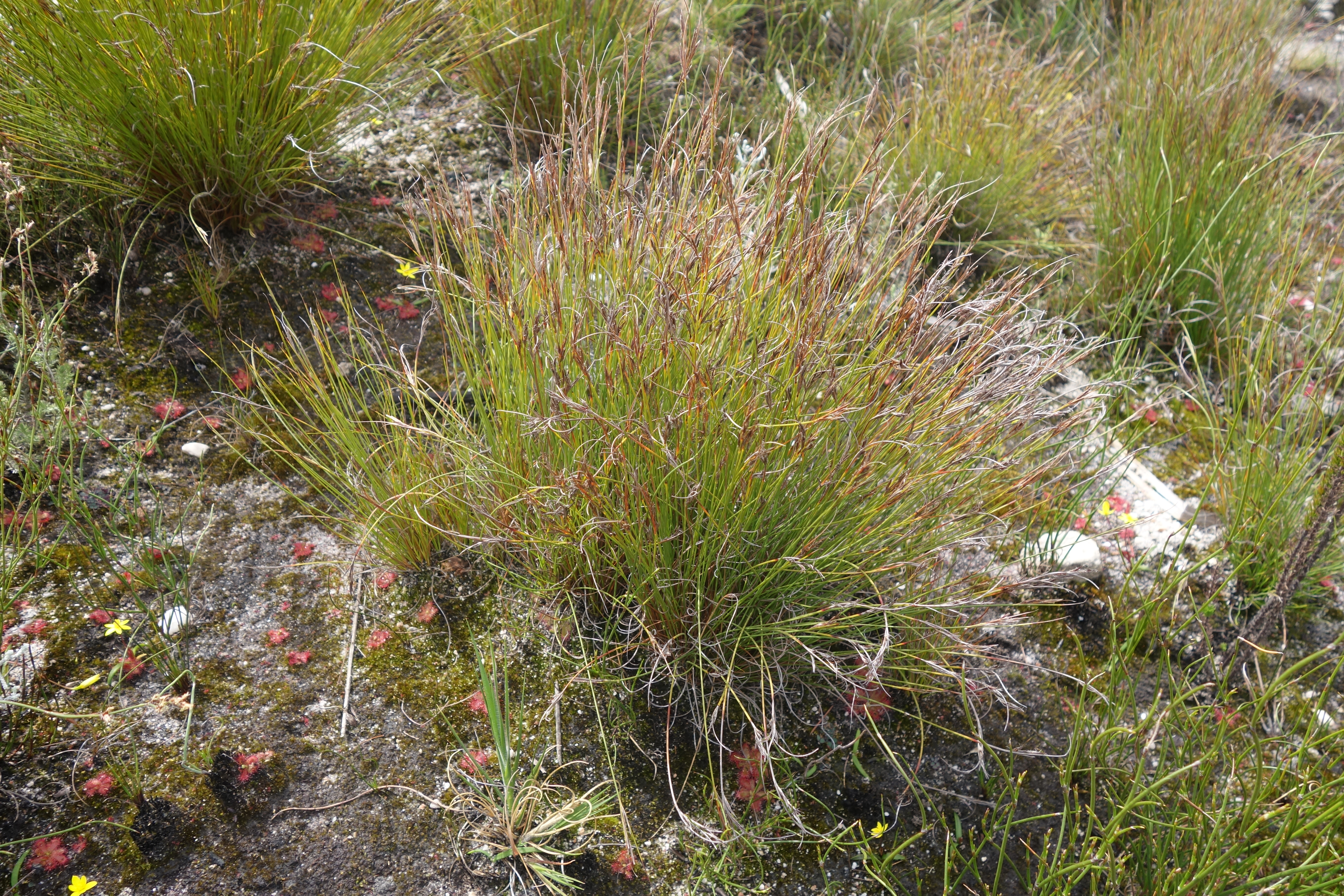
Growth form

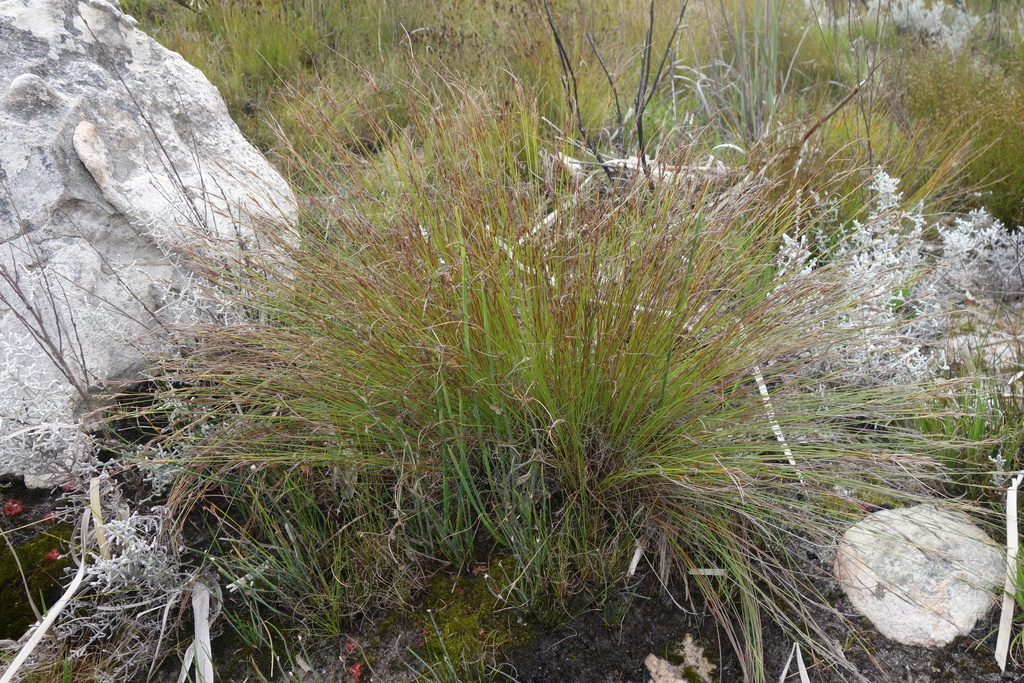
Growth form

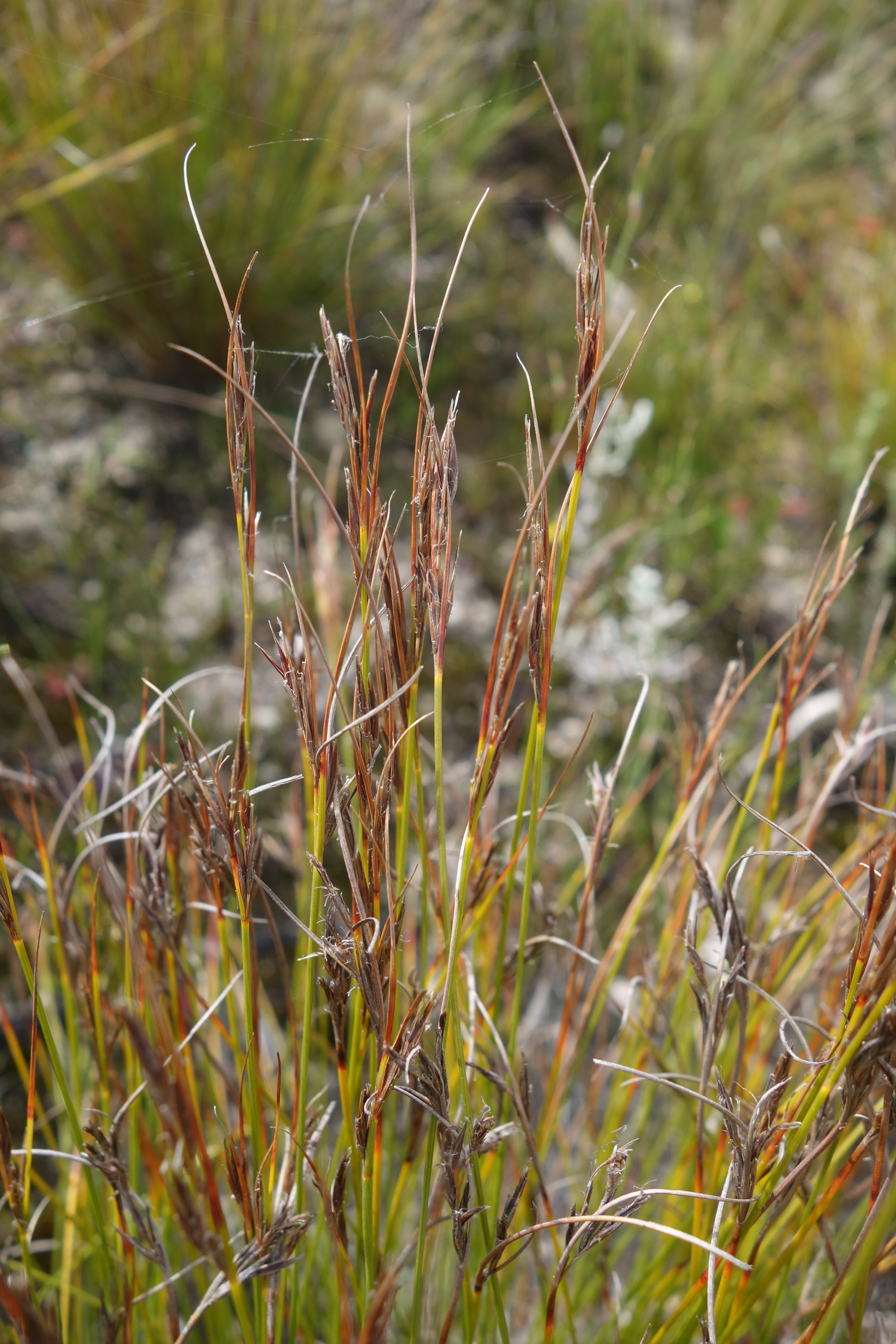
Flowering heads (inflorescences)

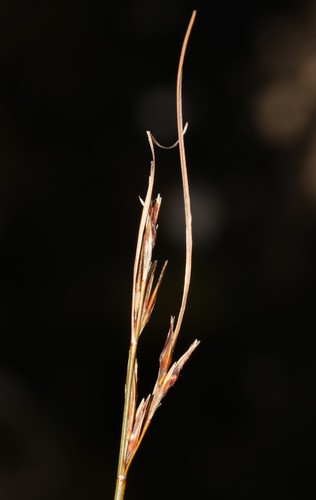
Flowering head
