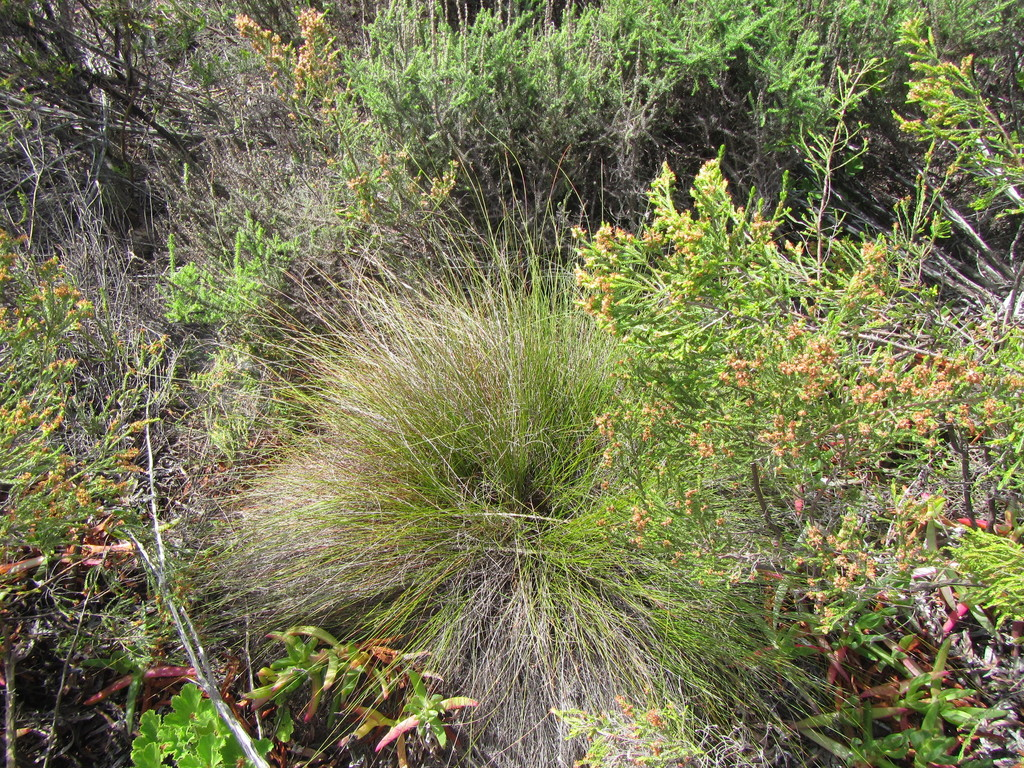
- Hidden veldrush

Scientific classification
- Kingdom: Plantae
- Clade: Tracheophytes
- Clade: Angiosperms
- Clade: Monocots
- Clade: Commelinids
- Order: Poales
- Family: Cyperaceae
- Genus: Schoenus
- Species: S. inconspicuus

Binomial name
- Schoenus inconspicuus T.L.Elliott, Euston-Brown & Muasya
- Documented collection localities in South Africa

= Schoenus inconspicuus =

Species of grass-like plant

Schoenus inconspicuus is a species of sedge endemic to south-western areas of the Western Cape Province of South Africa.

== Description ==
Schoenus inconspicuus has long, linear-lanceolate spikelets compared to other species of southern African Schoenus. Among the southern African Schoenus, Schoenus ligulatus also has relatively long, linear-lanceolate spikelets; however, the spikelets of S. inconspicuus are longer (> 6.6 mm) compared to the shorter spikelets of S. ligulatus, which are often less than 5.7 mm.

Furthermore, the spikelet glumes of S. inconspicuus are more paper-like, appearing silvery-white when young compared to those of S. ligulatus. These paper-like glumes then deteriorate and shred with age in S. inconspicuus. The lower spikelet glumes are also relatively long in length (often over half to 3/4 of the length of the spikelet) compared to those of S. ligulatus, which tend to be less than half of the length of the spikelet. The glume mucros of S. ligulatus are more prominent compared to the poorly-formed or lacking glume mucros of S. inconspicuus.

Habitat preferences differs notably between the two species, with Schoenus inconspicuus generally found on dry, acid sandy sites, while S. ligulatus is more common on wet sites.

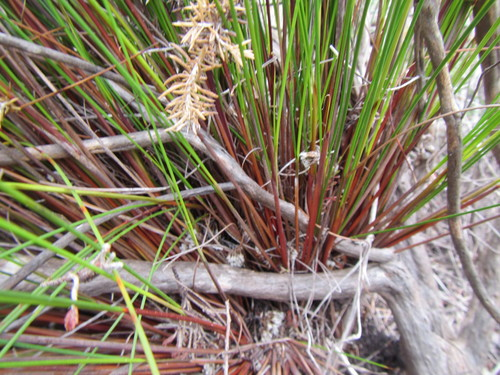
Culm bases

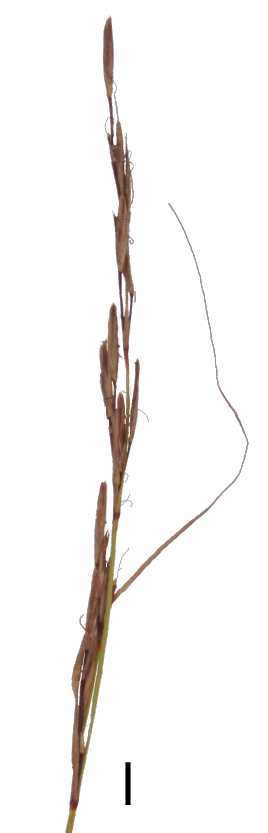
Inflorescence

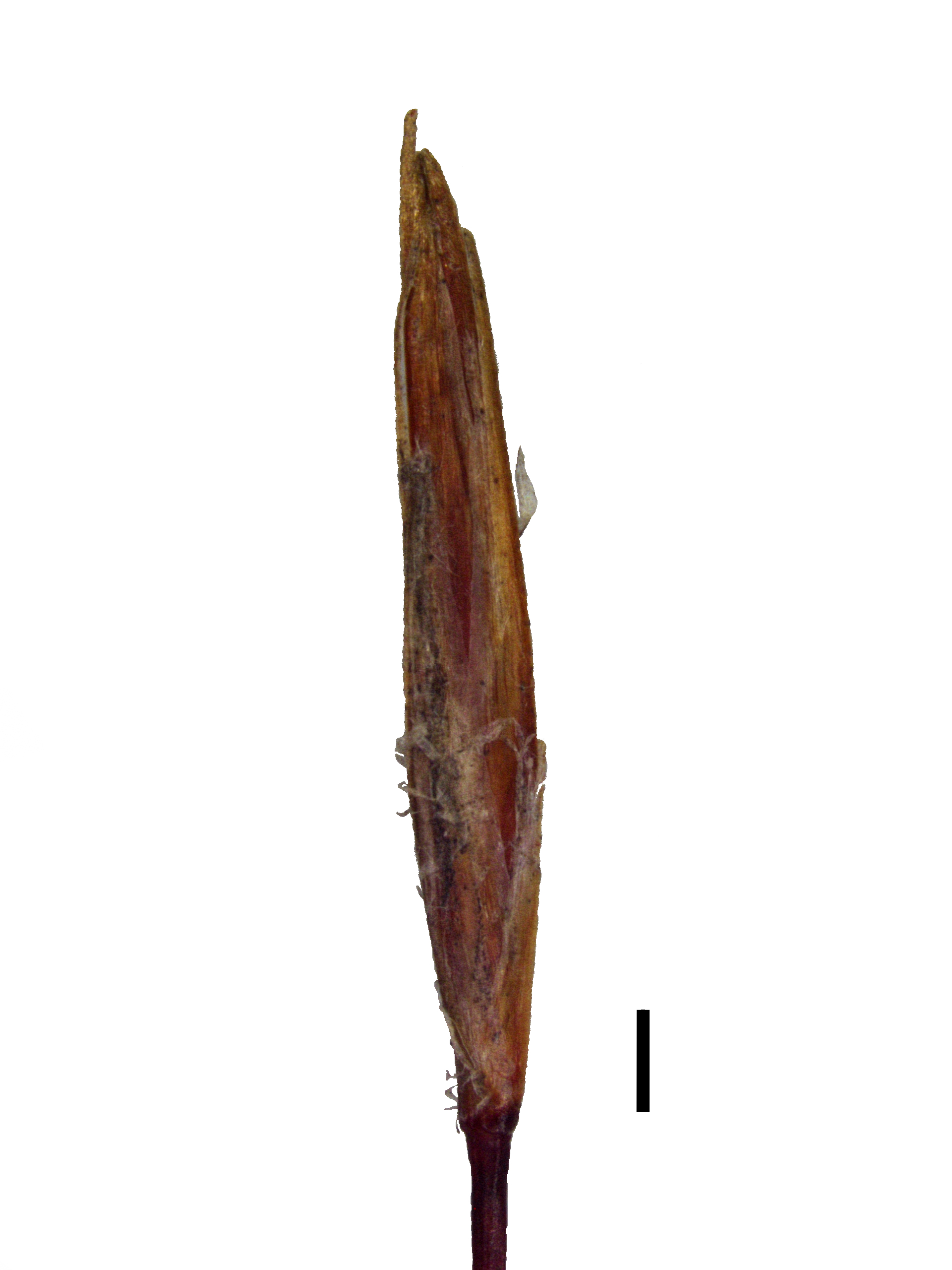
Spikelet (the black scale bar represents 1 mm)

== Taxonomy ==
Schoenus inconspicuus is a species in family Cyperaceae, tribe Schoeneae, which is a clade that includes genera such as Gahnia, Lepidosperma, Oreobolus, Costularia and Tetraria. Based on morphological evidence, Schoenus inconspicuus is closely related to other southern African Schoenus species, specifically, species in the S. cuspidatus and allies group.

Southern African Schoenus were once classified as Tetraria, but we currently know that the two groups are evolutionary distinct based on molecular and morphological differences. To ensure that this group of sedges is monophyletic (i.e. the genus only has closely related species), several species of Epischoenus and the southern African Tetraria were transferred into Schoenus. Two key differences between the two genera are that the southern African Schoenus do not have reticulate sheaths at the bases of the flowering stems and they lack the stem leaves that can be observed in Tetraria.

== Distribution and habitat ==
Schoenus inconspicuus has been reported recently from only a couple of locations: one on the Cape Peninsula and a second in the Overberg region of the Western Cape Province. The preferred habitat of this species is rare acid sand flats, with an elevation range of between 14 and 250 m.

== Gallery ==
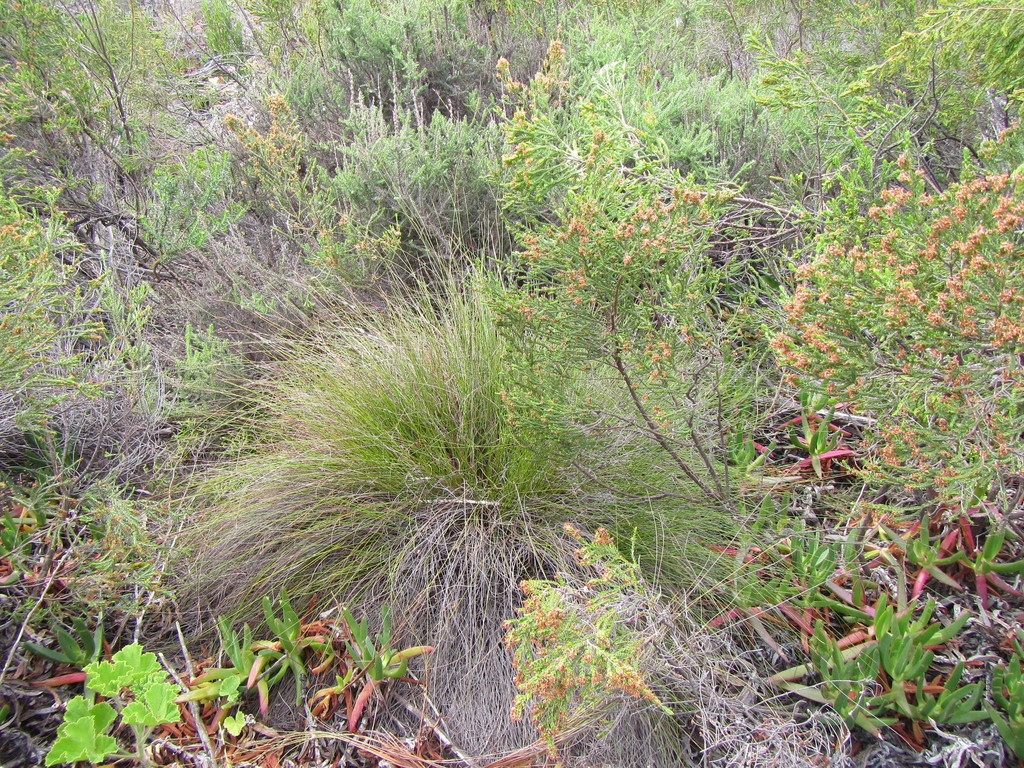
Growth form

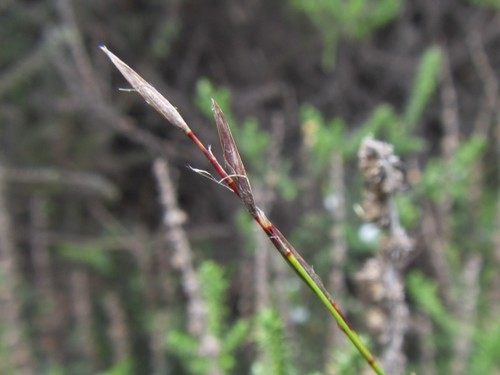
Flowering head
