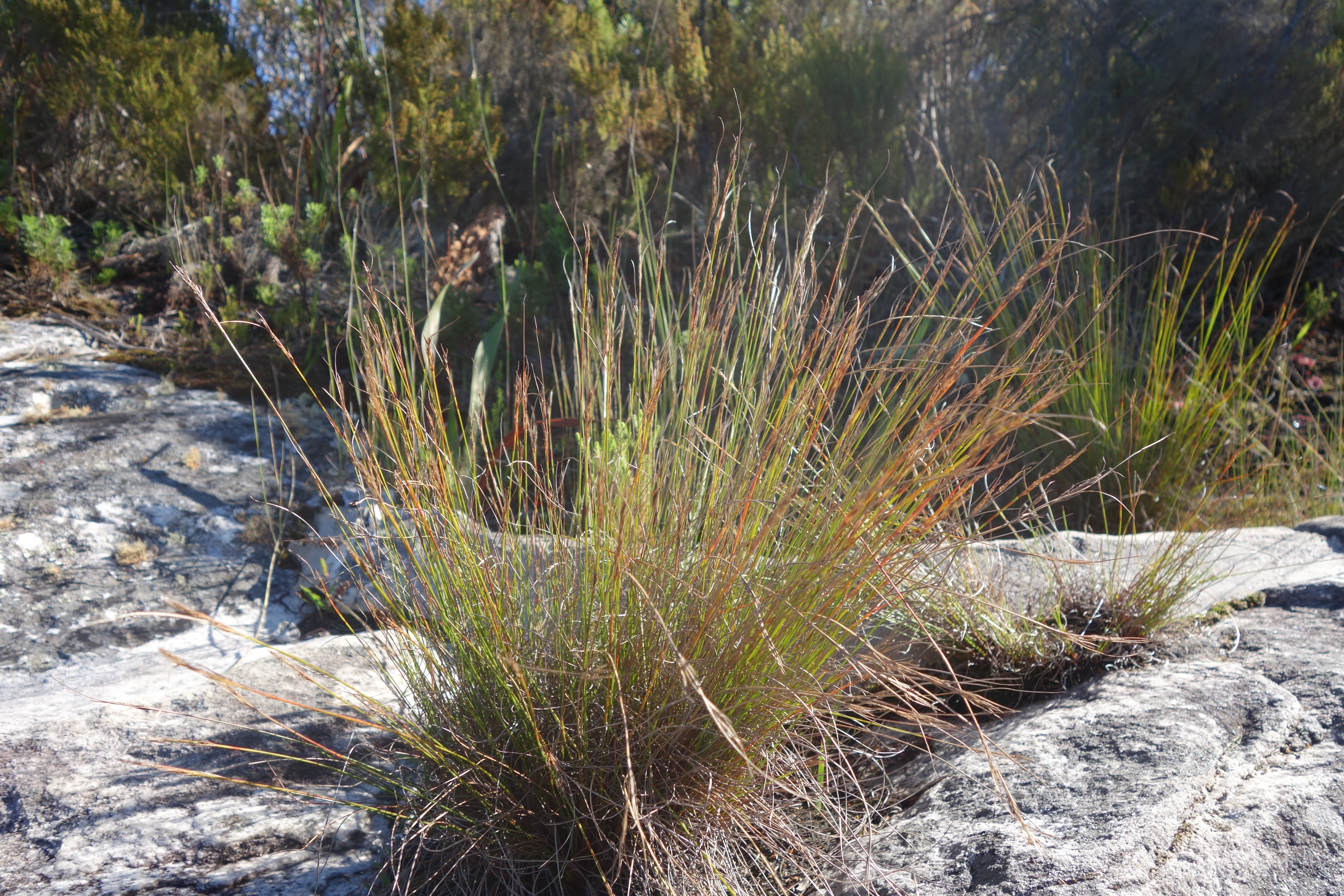
- Strap veldrush

Scientific classification
- Kingdom: Plantae
- Clade: Tracheophytes
- Clade: Angiosperms
- Clade: Monocots
- Clade: Commelinids
- Order: Poales
- Family: Cyperaceae
- Genus: Schoenus
- Species: S. ligulatus

Binomial name
- Schoenus ligulatus (Boeckeler) Kuntze
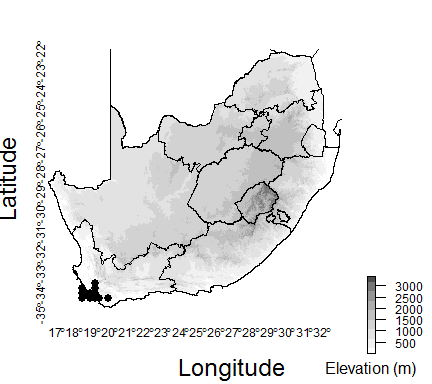
- Documented collection localities

Synonyms
- Elynanthus ligulatus Boeckeler; Tetraria ligulata (Boeckeler) C.B.Clarke; Tetraria cuspidata Rottb. C.B.Clarke var. ligulata (Boeckeler) Kük.; Tetraria cuspidata Rottb. C.B.Clarke var. angustata Kük.; Tetraria autumnalis Levyns; Schoenus autumnalis (Levyns) T.L.Elliott & Muasya; Tetraria variabilis Levyns; Schoenus variabilis (Levyns) T.L.Elliott & Muasya

= Schoenus ligulatus =

Species of grass-like plant

Schoenus ligulatus is a species of sedge endemic to the western regions of the Western Cape Province of South Africa.

== Description ==
The key diagnostic character of S. ligulatus are its linear-lanceolate spikelets and narrow elliptic nutlets.

Schoenus exilis resembles S. ligulatus, but the former is a shorter species (<350 mm) compared to the taller S. ligulatus (>350 mm). In addition, the spikelets of S. exilis are shorter (mostly <4.5 mm) compared to those of S. ligulatus. Another key difference between the two species is that S. exilis often has membranaceous ligules, whereas the ligules of S. ligulatus tend to be firmer.

Schoenus quartziticus is also a similar species; however, it has broad elliptic nutlets and shorter spikelets (<4.0 mm) compared to those of S. ligulatus.

Similar to other sedges, plants in this group are very difficult to identify. It appears that part of this problem is caused by the tendency of the southern African Schoenus to form hybrids with each other. It appears that Schoenus ligulatus forms hybrids with other southern African Schoenus species, specifically Schoenus cuspidatus.

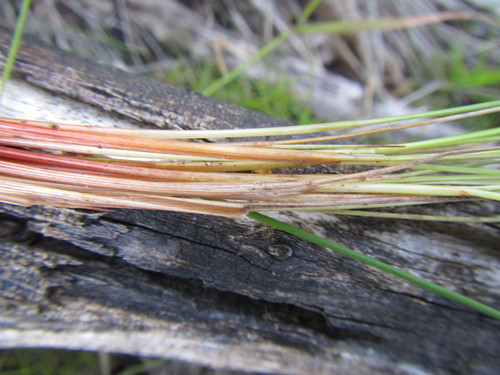
Bases of flowering stems (culms)

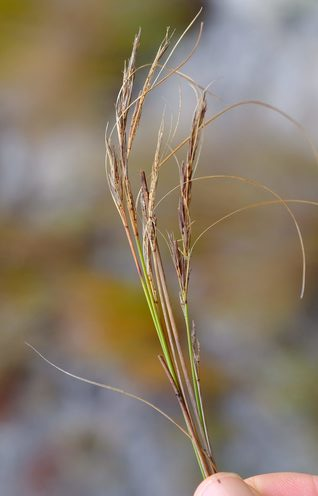
Flowering heads (inflorescences)

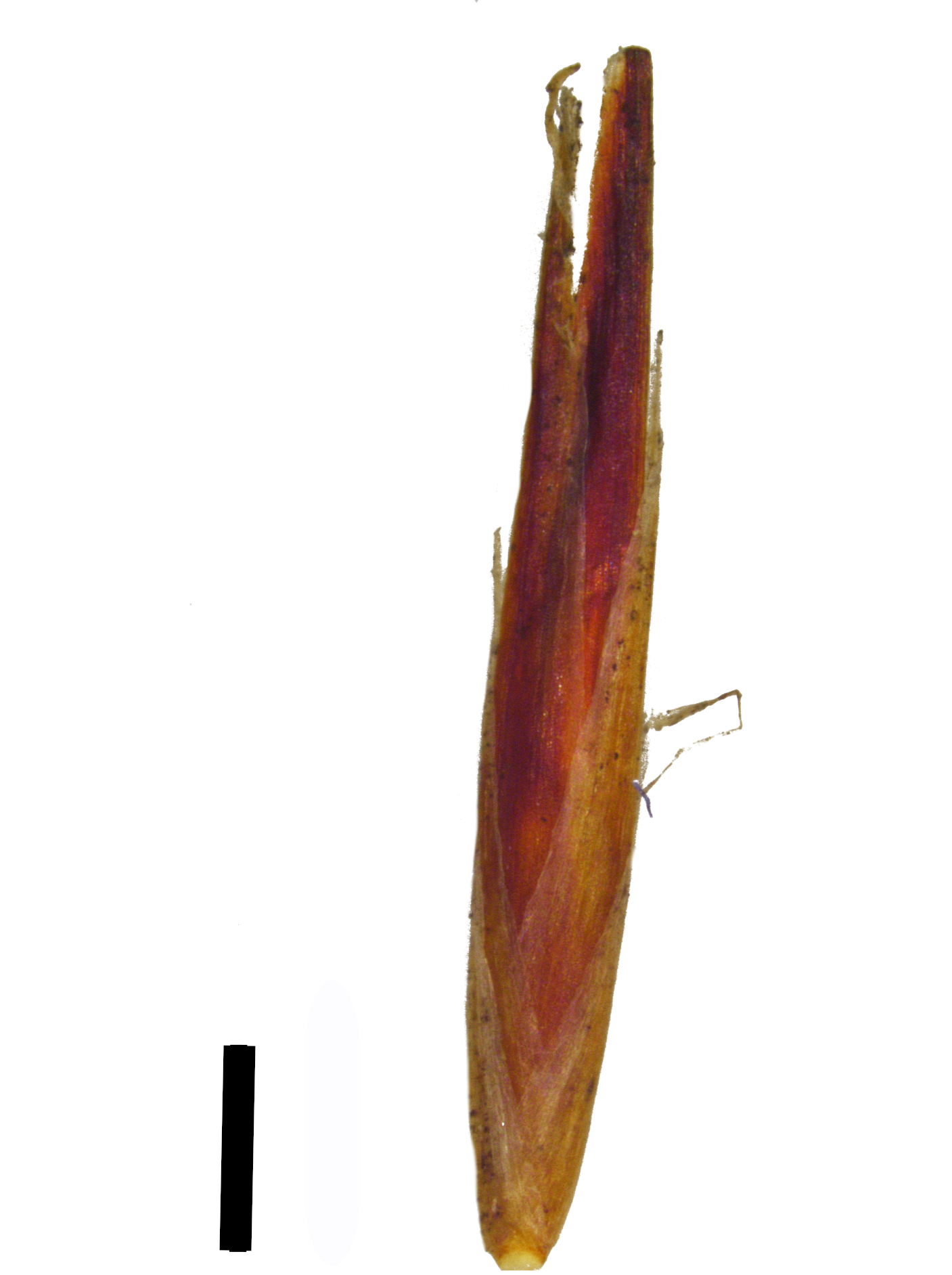
Spikelet (black scale bar represents 1 mm)

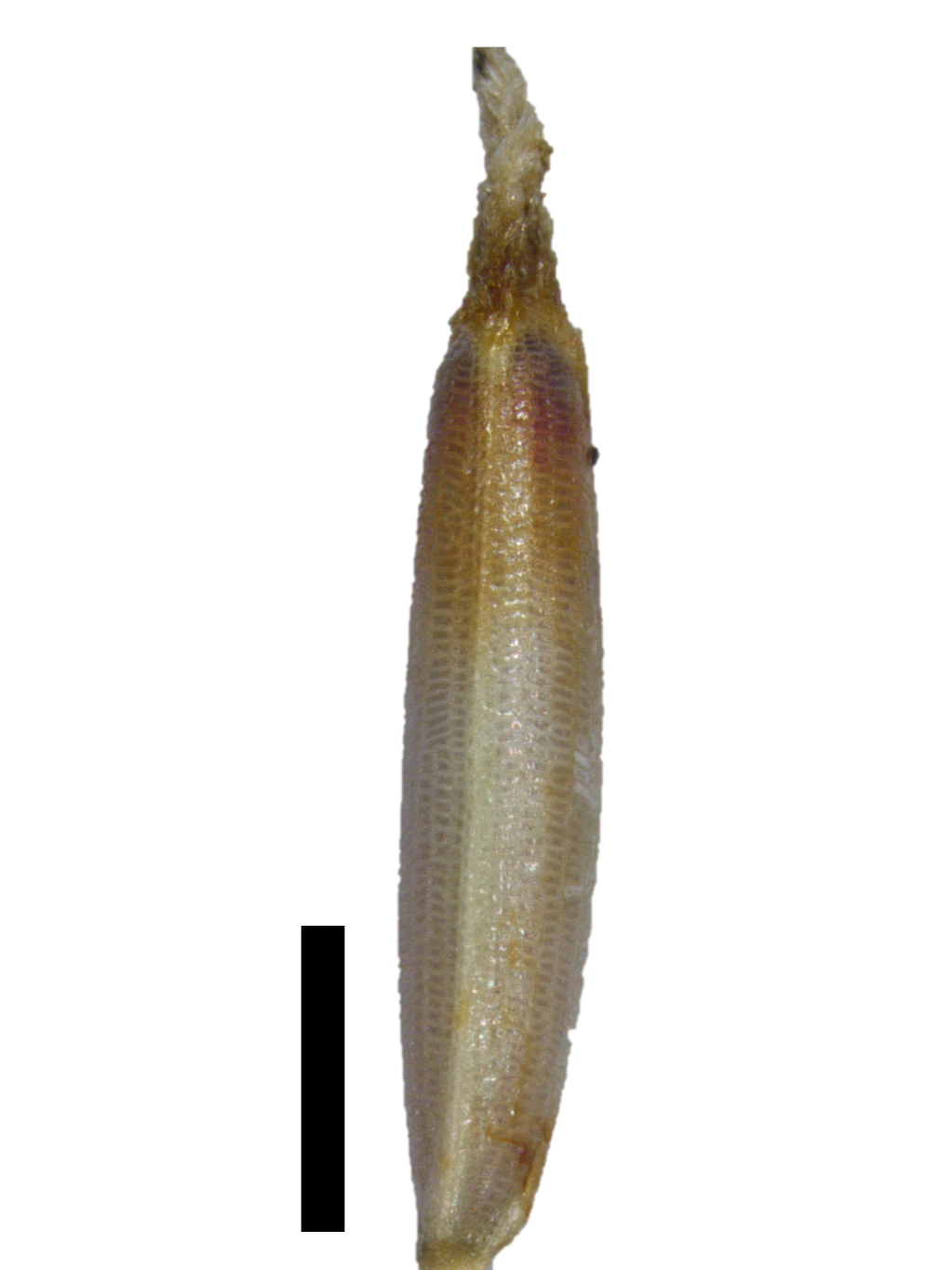
Nutlet (black scale bar represents 1 mm)

== Taxonomy ==
Schoenus ligulatus is a species in family Cyperaceae, tribe Schoeneae. Other notable genera in tribe Schoeneae include Lepidosperma, Oreobolus, Costularia, Tetraria and Gahnia. The most closely related species to S. ligulatus are other southern African Schoenus species, specifically, species in the S. cuspidatus and allies group.

Southern African Schoenus were once classified as Tetraria; however, based on molecular and morphological differences, we now know that the two groups are evolutionary distinct. To ensure that this group of sedges is monophyletic (i.e. the genus only has closely related species), several species of Epischoenus and the southern African Tetraria were transferred into Schoenus. In the field, the southern African Schoenus can be distinguished from Tetraria species by their lack of stem leaves and the absence of reticulate sheaths at the bases of the flowering stems.

== Distribution and habitat ==
Schoenus ligulatus is a species of sedge found in the western areas of the Western Cape Province of South Africa. This species generally occurs in wet habitats, but it can also be found growing on drier sites. The reported elevation range of S. ligulatus is between 100 and 750 m.

== Images ==
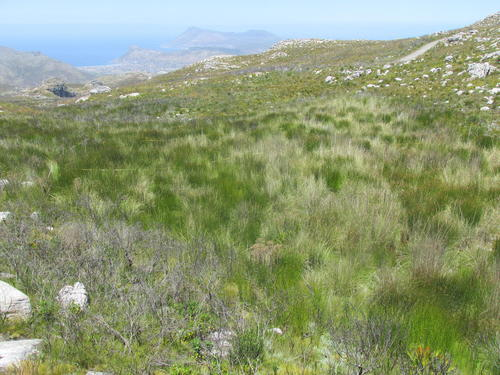
Population of Schoenus ligulatus

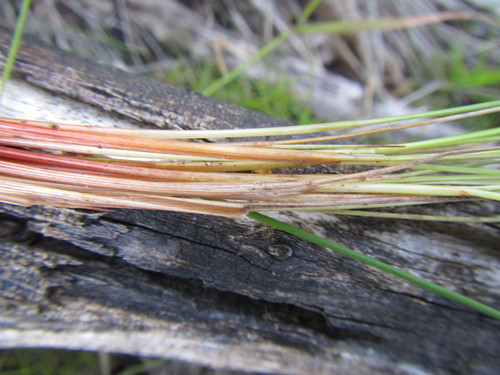
Bases of flowering stems

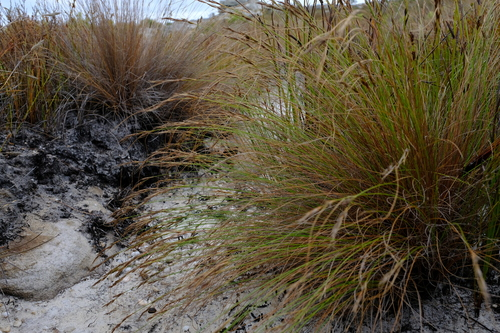
Growth form

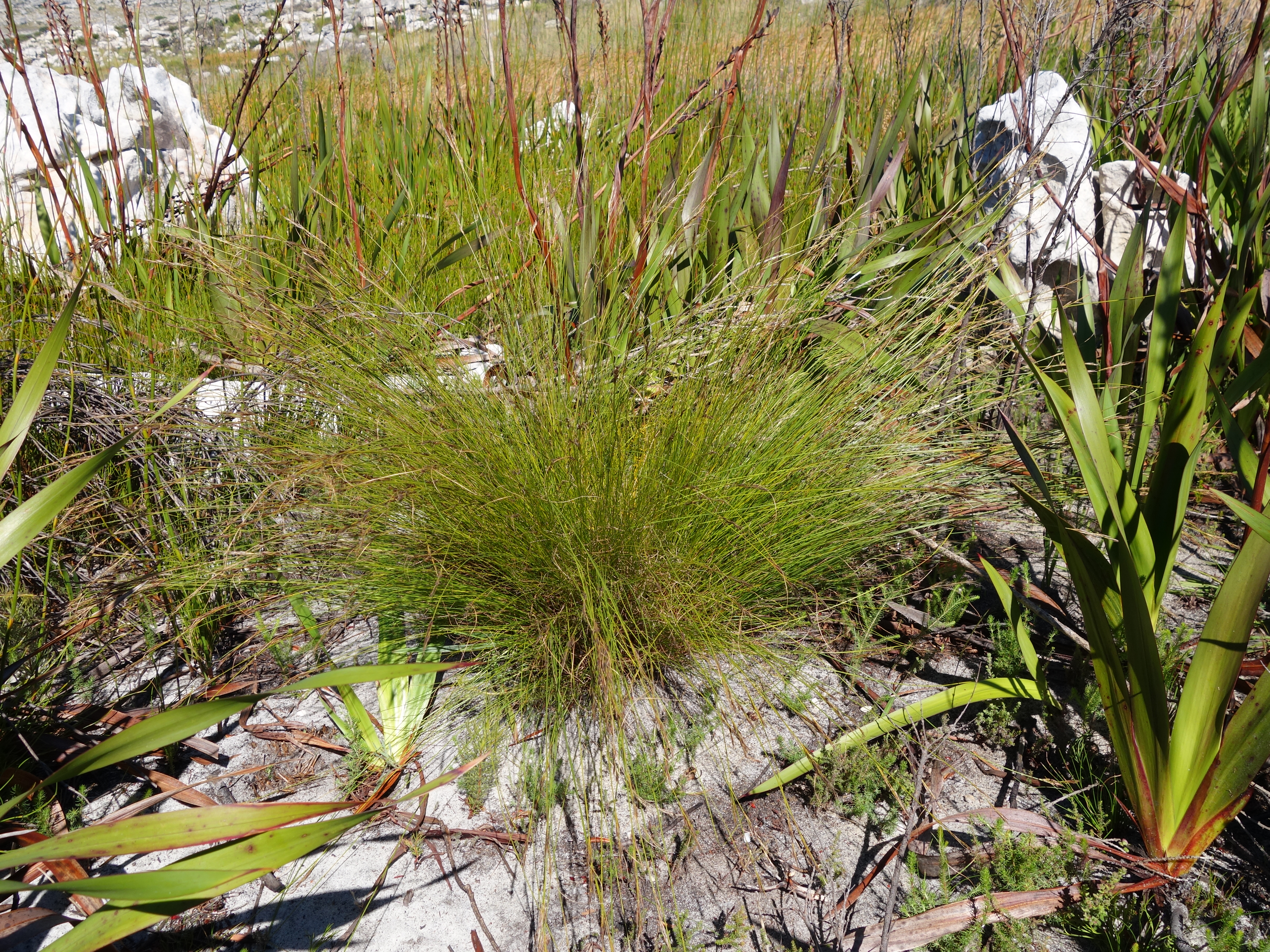
Growth form

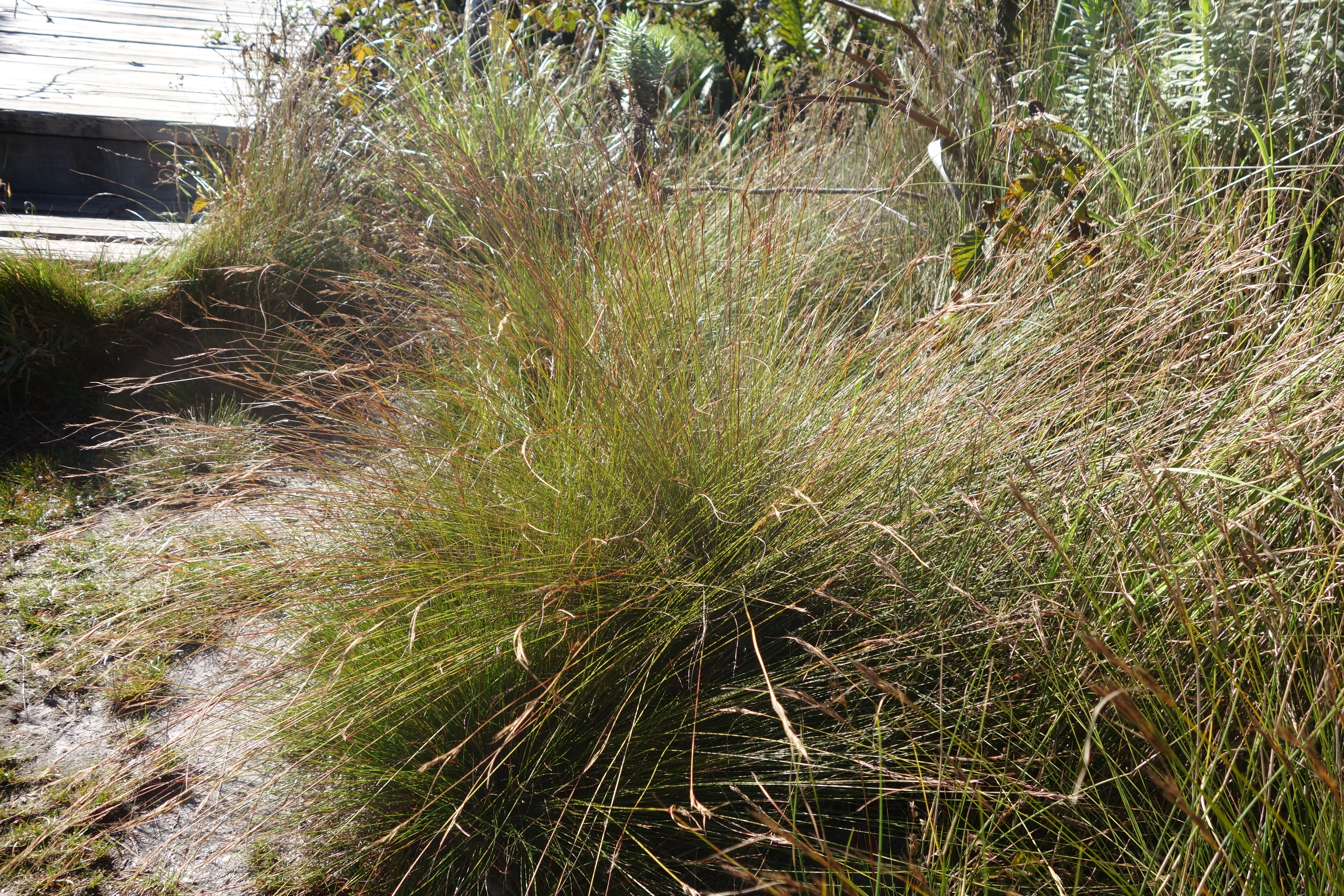
Growth form

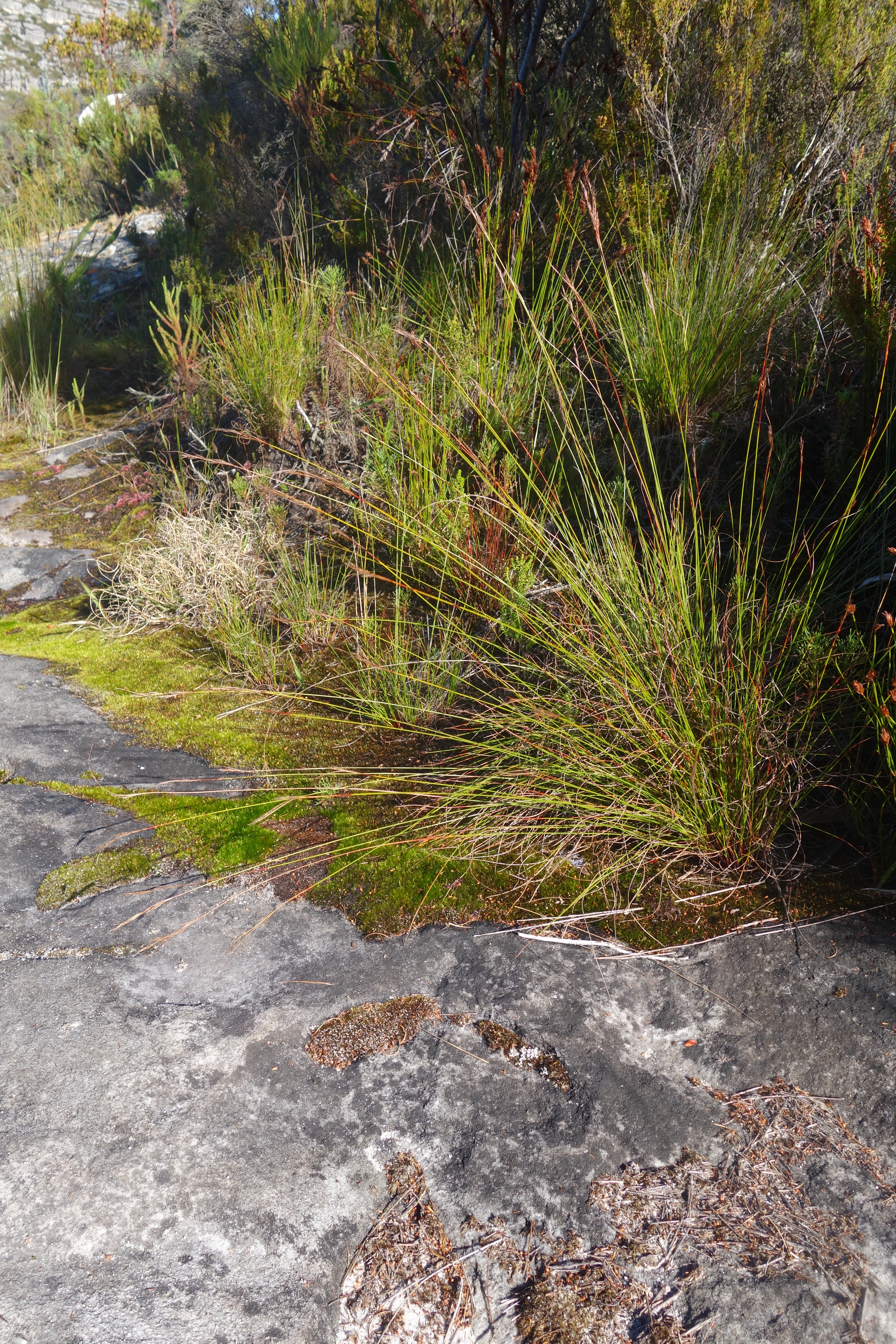
Growth form

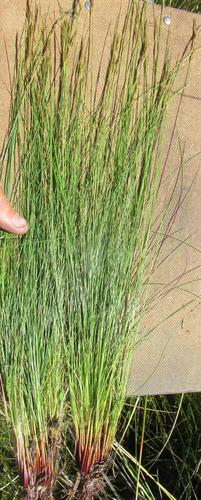
Plants

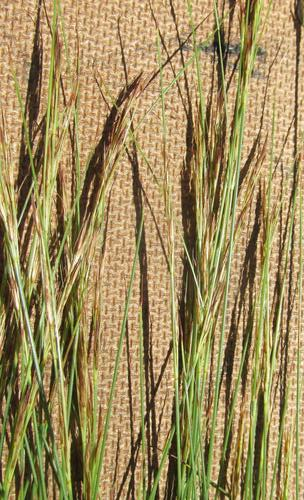
Flowering heads

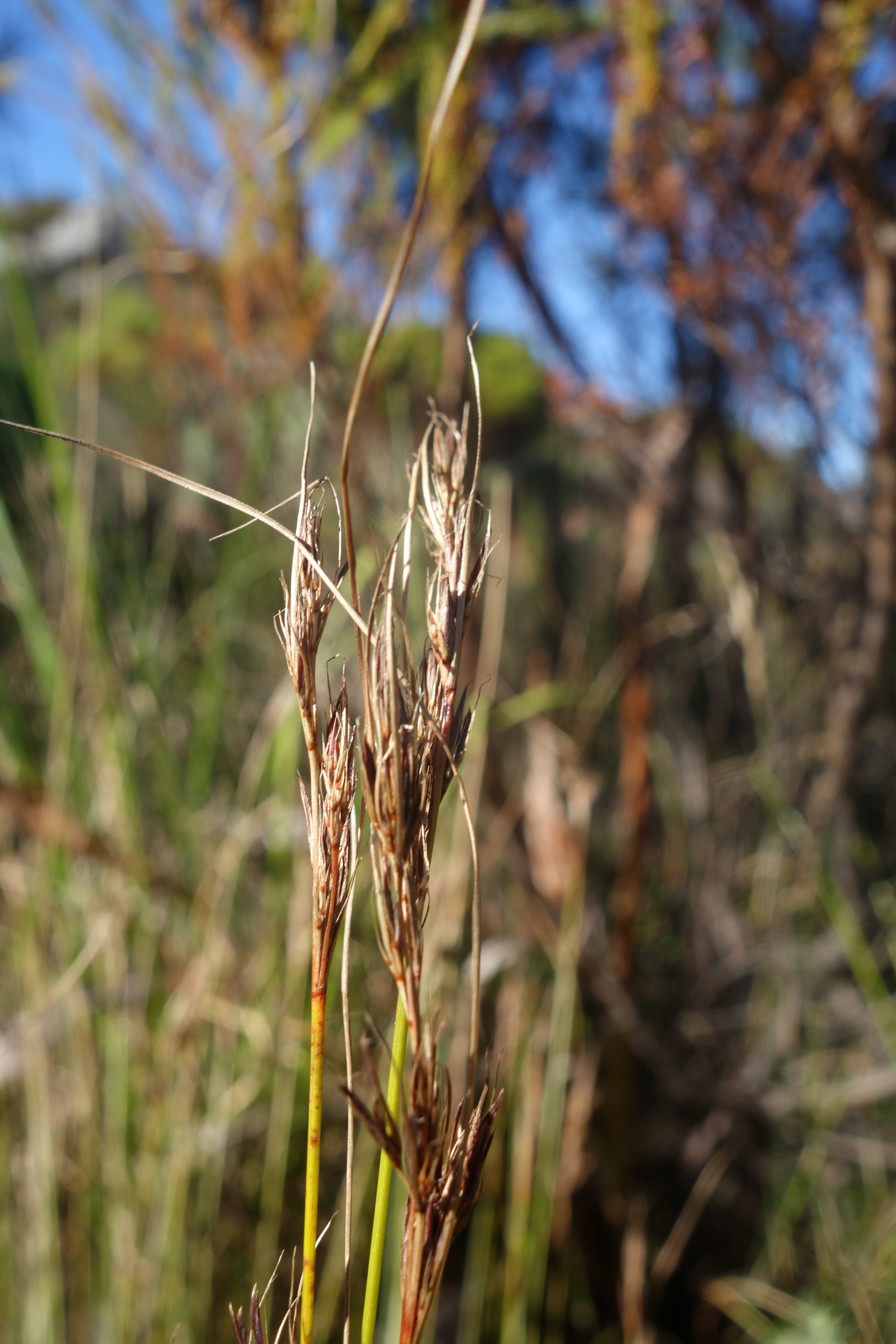
Flowering heads

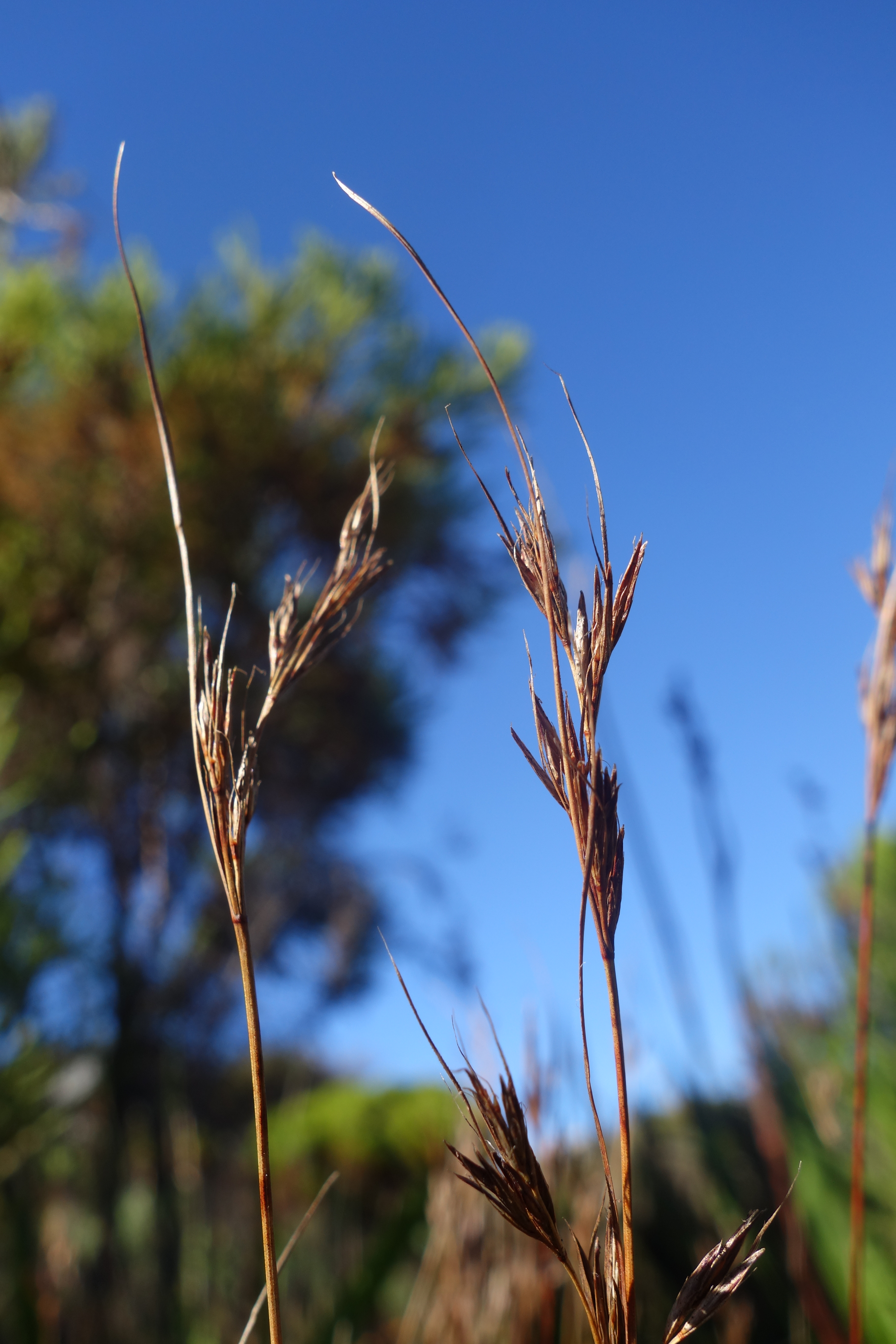
Flowering heads
