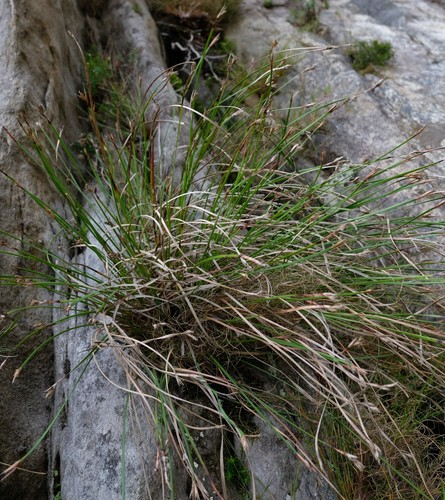
- Flat veldrush

Scientific classification
- Kingdom: Plantae
- Clade: Tracheophytes
- Clade: Angiosperms
- Clade: Monocots
- Clade: Commelinids
- Order: Poales
- Family: Cyperaceae
- Genus: Schoenus
- Species: S. complanatus

Binomial name
- Schoenus complanatus (Levyns) T.L.Elliott & Muasya
- Documented collection localities in South Africa

Synonyms
- Epischoenus complanatus Levyns

= Schoenus complanatus =

Species of grass-like plant

Schoenus complanatus is a species of sedge endemic to the western mountains of the Western Cape Province of South Africa.

== Description ==
Schoenus complanatus has distinctly flattened culms and leaves that make it distinct amongst the southern African Schoenus.

Similar to other species in the Epischoenus group, S. complanatus is generally leafless. However, sometimes leaves arise from separate shoots at the base of the plants, which might be a trait that arises post-fire. The only other southern African Schoenus species that displays this character is Schoenus selinae.

Southern African Schoenus might form hybrids with each other, which partially explains the difficulties in identifying these species. It is doubtful that S. complanatus forms hybrids with other southern Africa Schoenus species based on preliminary evidence.

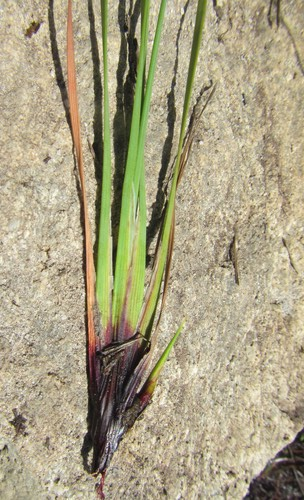
Base of flowering stems (culms)

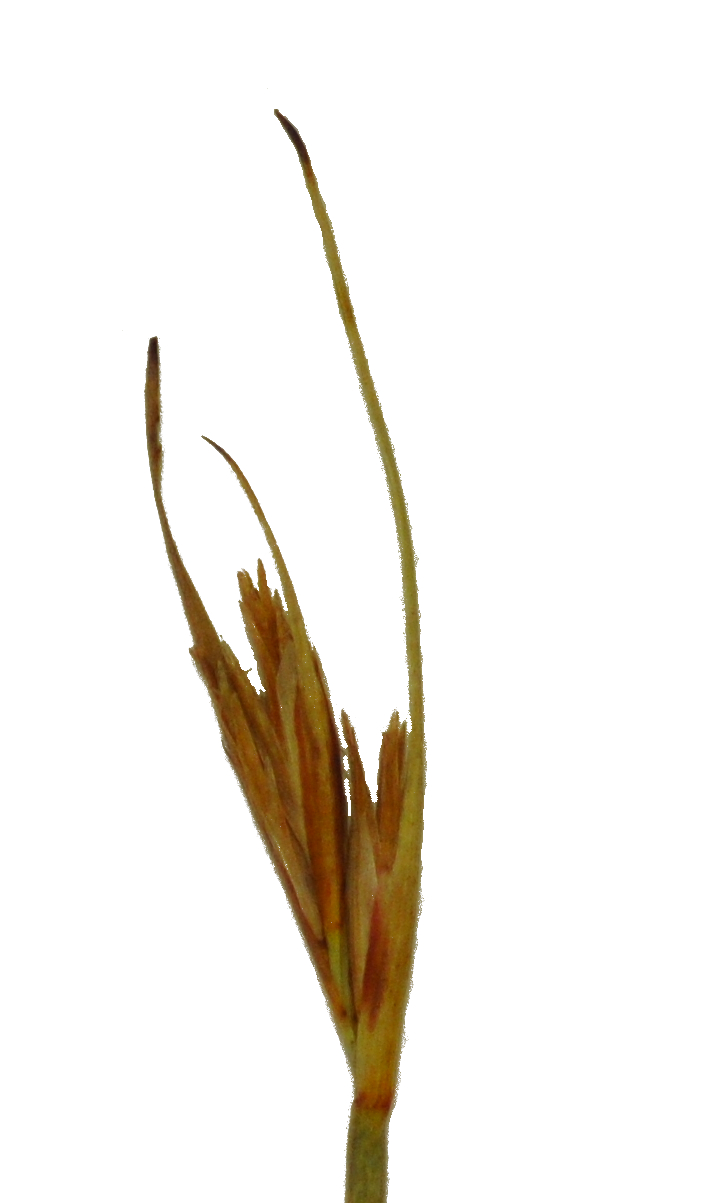
Flowering head (inflorescence)

Spikelet

Nutlet (the black scale bar represents 1 mm)

== Taxonomy ==
Schoenus complanatus is a species in family Cyperaceae, tribe Schoeneae, which includes other notable genera such as: Costularia, Gahnia, Lepidosperma, Oreobolus and Tetraria. Phylogenetic and morphological evidence suggests that species in the Epischoenus group are the closest relatives to S. complanatus.

The genus Tetraria once included species from the southern African Schoenus; however, we now know that the two groups are evolutionary distinct based on morphological and molecular differences.

To ensure that Schoenus is monophyletic (i.e. the genus only has closely related species), several species of southern African Epischoenus and Tetraria were transferred into Schoenus. The main distinguishing traits between Tetraria and Schoenus in the field are the lack of stem leaves and absence of reticulate sheaths at the bases of the flowering stems in the latter genus.

== Distribution and habitat ==
Schoenus complanatus has mostly been collected from damp sites on high mountains, ranging from 540-1850 m. The distribution of this species ranges from the Groot Winterhoek Mountains in the north to the Kogelberg area in the south.

== Gallery ==
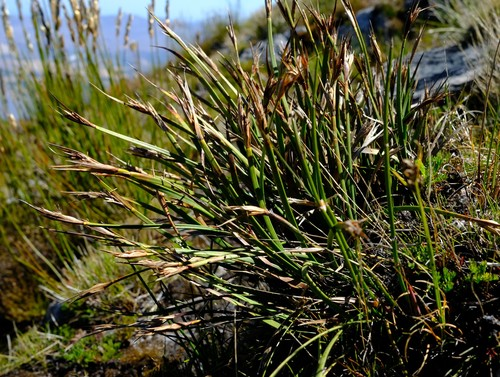
Growth form

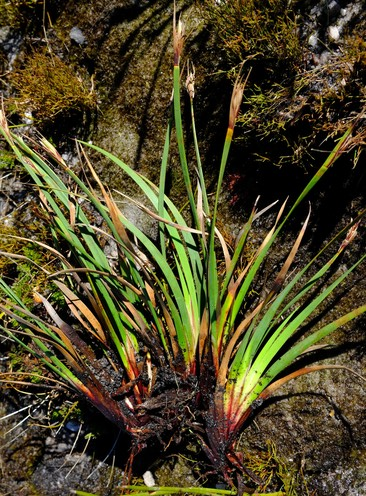
Plant with flat culms and leaves

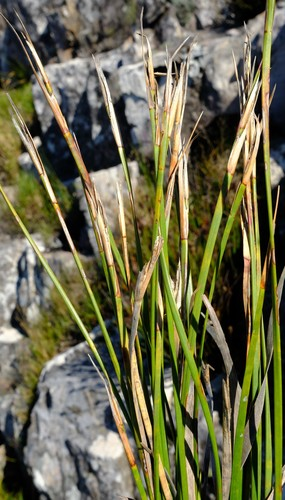
Flowering heads

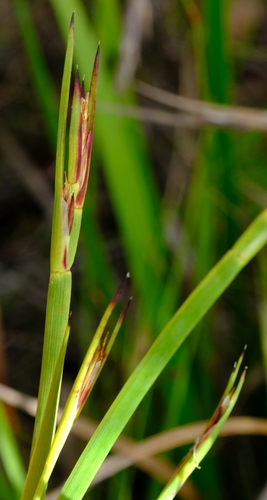
Flowering heads
