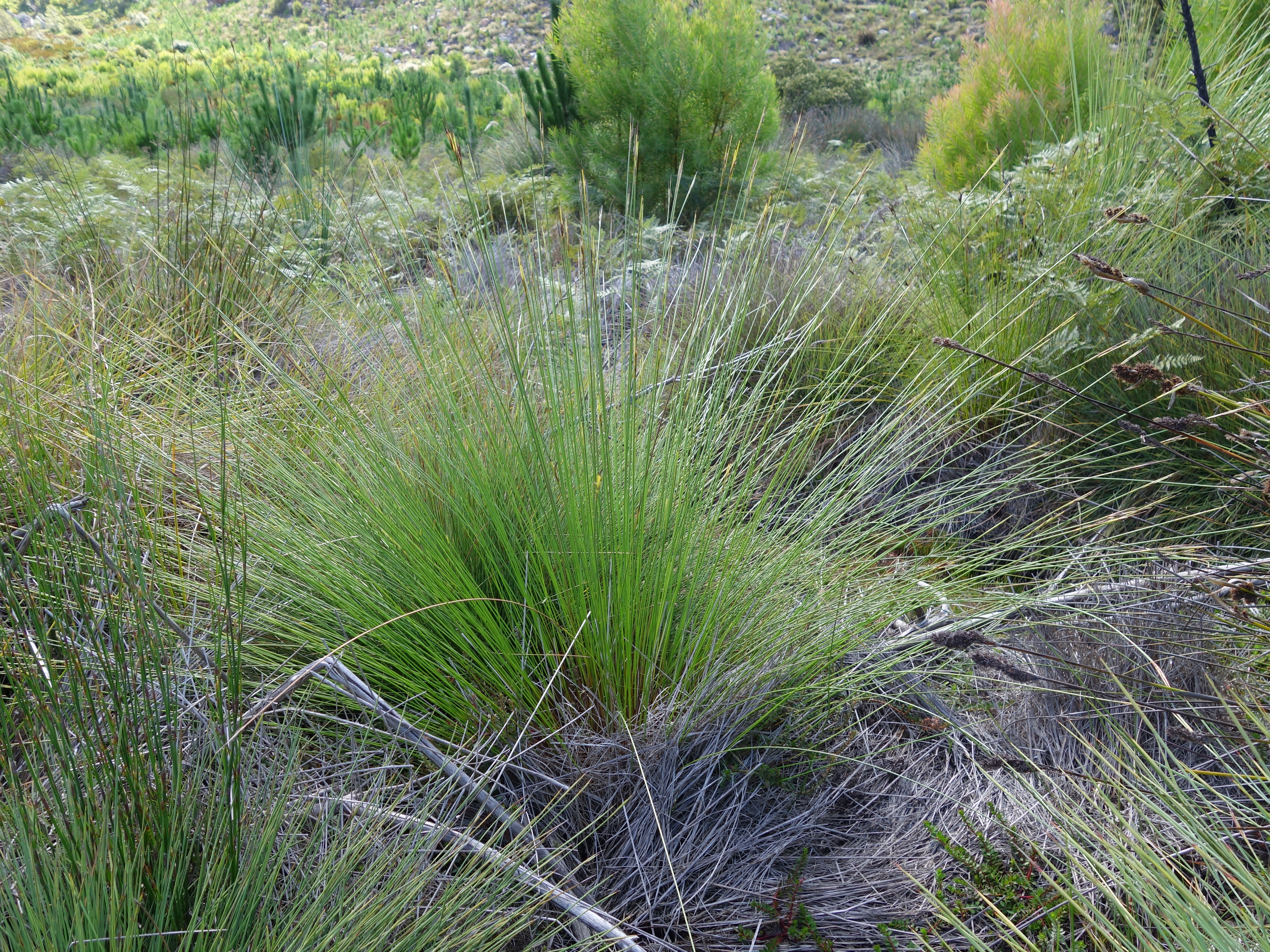
- Hairy veldrush

Scientific classification
- Kingdom: Plantae
- Clade: Tracheophytes
- Clade: Angiosperms
- Clade: Monocots
- Clade: Commelinids
- Order: Poales
- Family: Cyperaceae
- Genus: Schoenus
- Species: S. neovillosus

Binomial name
- Schoenus neovillosus T.L.Elliott & Muasya
- Documented collection localities in South Africa

Synonyms
- Epischoenus villosus Levyns; non Schoenus villosus R.Br.

= Schoenus neovillosus =

Species of grass-like plant

Schoenus neovillosus is a species of sedge endemic to the south-western mountains of the Western Cape Province of South Africa.

== Description ==
Schoenus neovillosus is one of the most hairy species of southern African Schoenus. The spikelets and often the culms of this species are hairy, similar to Schoenus crinitus, Schoenus lucidus and also sometimes Schoenus gracillimus.

The inflorescences of S. neovillosus generally are less congested, with a longer proximal rachis, inflorescence and primary inflorescence bracts compared to those of S. lucidus. In addition, the spikelets of S. crinitus and S. gracillimus are more dispersed throughout the inflorescence, whereas the spikes of S. neovillosus form more overlapping clusters compared to the former two species.

The form of the inflorescence of Schoenus selinae is similar to that of S. neovillosus; however, there is not hair on the inflorescence of S. selinae. Another key difference is that S. neovillosus does not have the paper-like lateral extensions on its primary inflorescence bracts that are present in S. selinae.

Specimens collected from the Kogelberg region tend to be hairier than those from other regions.

Certain species of southern African Schoenus might form hybrids with each other, which partially explains the difficulties in identifying these species. At this time, it is not clear whether S. neovillosus forms hybrids with other southern Africa Schoenus species.

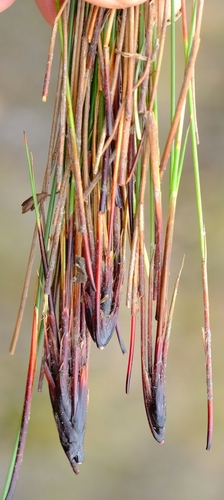
Base of flowering stems (culms)

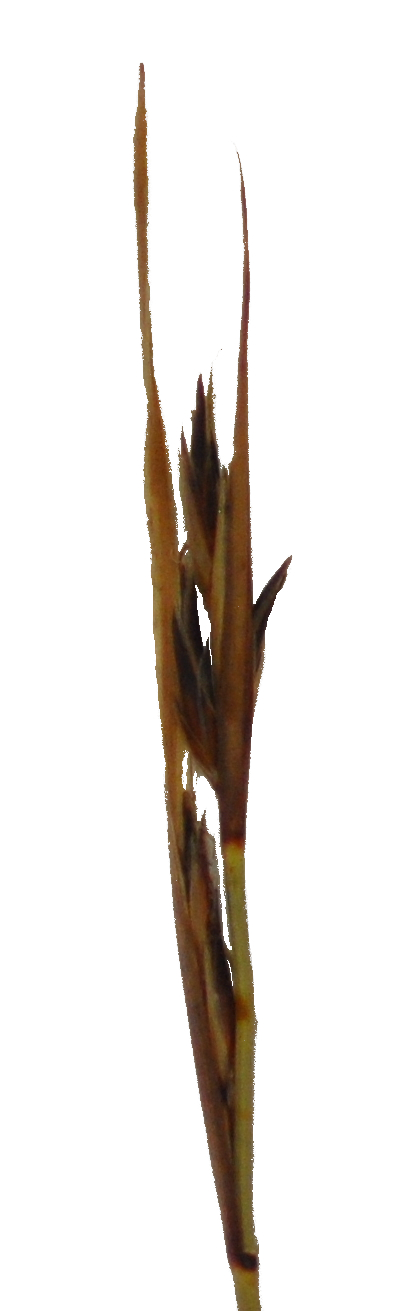
Flowering head (inflorescence)

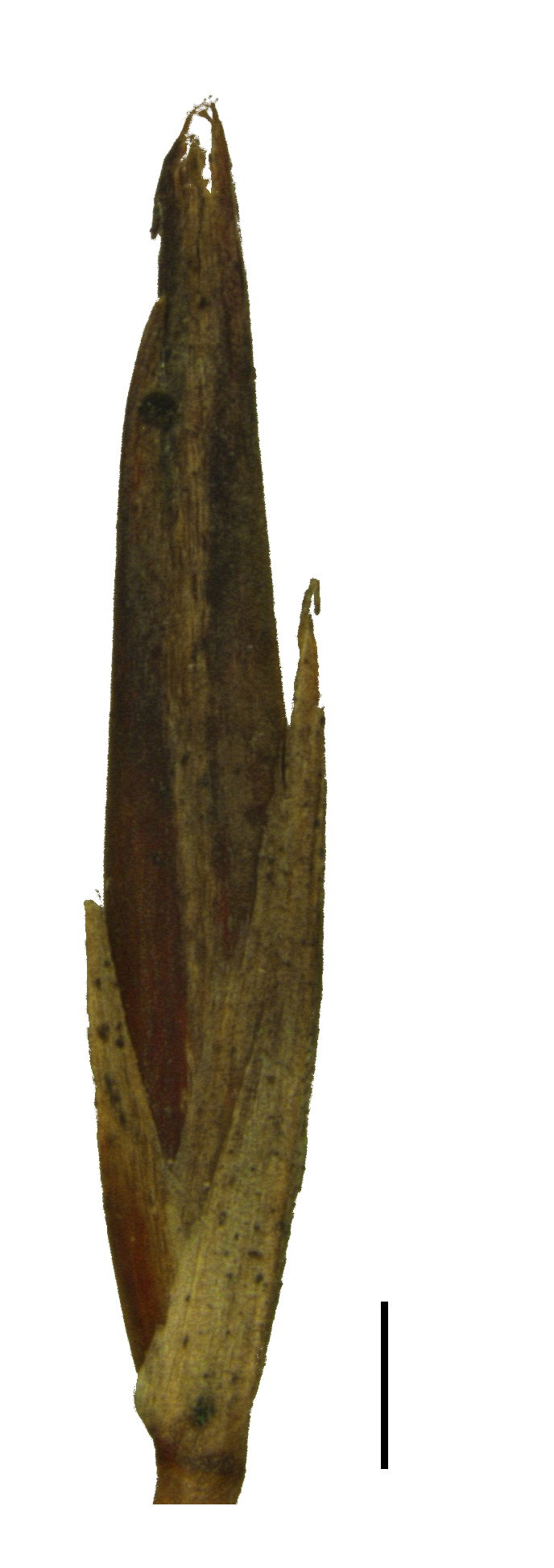
Spikelet (the black scale bar represents 1 mm)

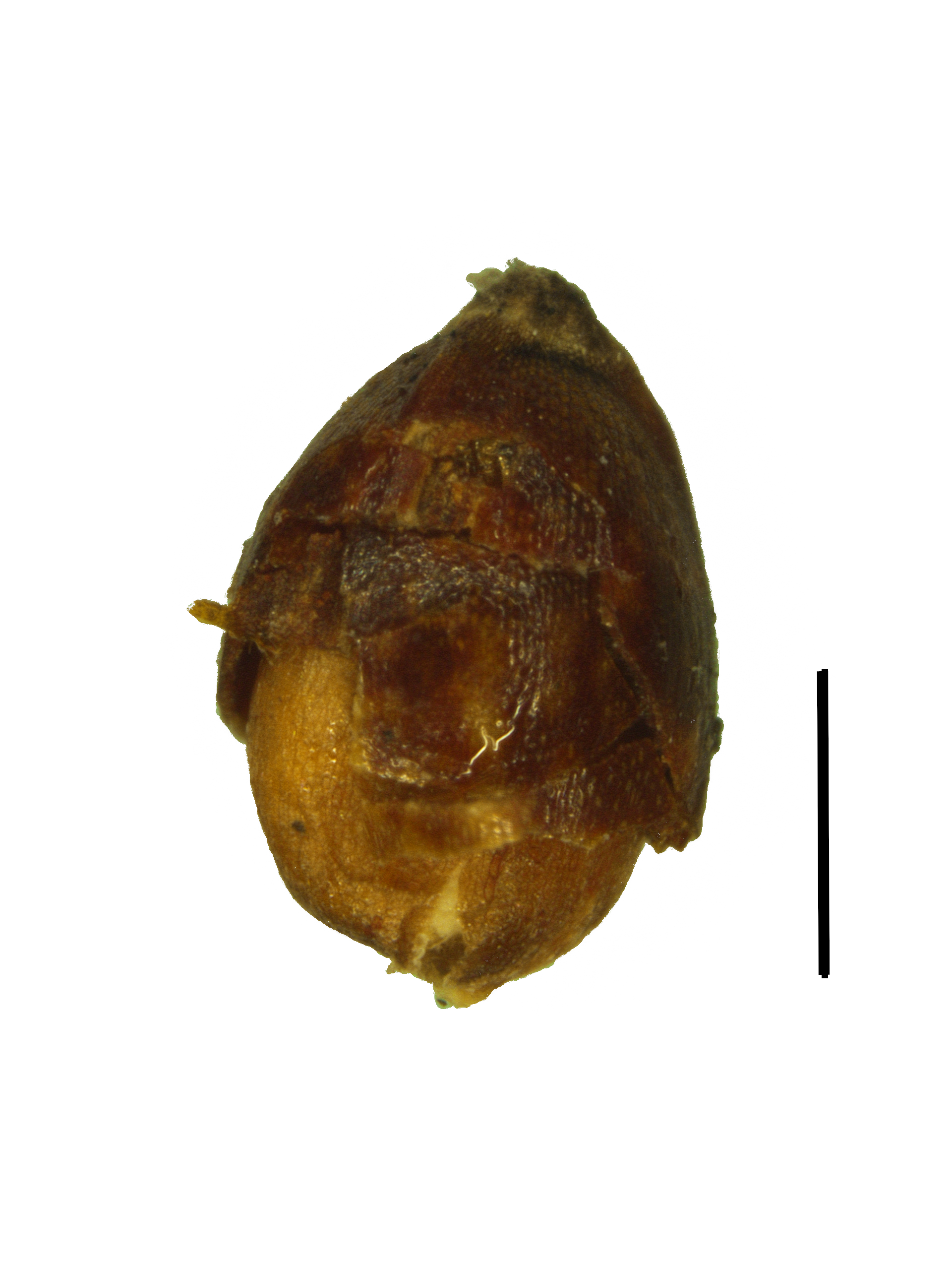
Nutlet (the black scale bar represents 1 mm)

== Taxonomy ==
Schoenus neovillosus is a species in family Cyperaceae, tribe Schoeneae. This tribe has other notable genera such as Costularia, Gahnia, Lepidosperma, Oreobolus and Tetraria. Phylogenetic and morphological evidence suggests that the closest relative to S. neovillosus are species in the Epischoenus group of Schoenus.

The genus Tetraria once included species from the southern African Schoenus; however, we now know that the two groups are evolutionary distinct based on morphological and molecular differences.

To ensure that Schoenus is monophyletic (i.e. the genus only has closely related species), several species of the southern African Tetraria and Epischoenus were transferred into Schoenus. The main distinguishing traits between Tetraria and Schoenus in the field are the lack of stem leaves and absence of reticulate sheaths at the bases of the flowering stems in Schoenus.

== Distribution and habitat ==
The known distribution of Schoenus neovillosus ranges from the Riviersonderend area in the east to the Cape Peninsula in the west — generally along the southwestern mountains of the Western Cape Province. This species mostly prefers moist sites, and it has been collected from near sea level to over 1800 m.

== Gallery ==
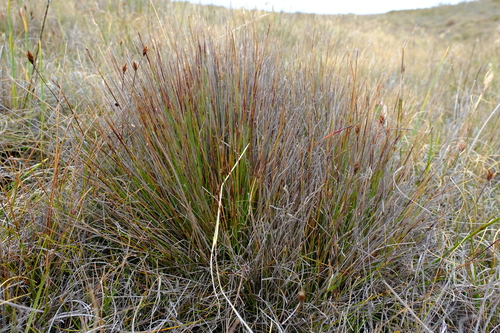
Growth form

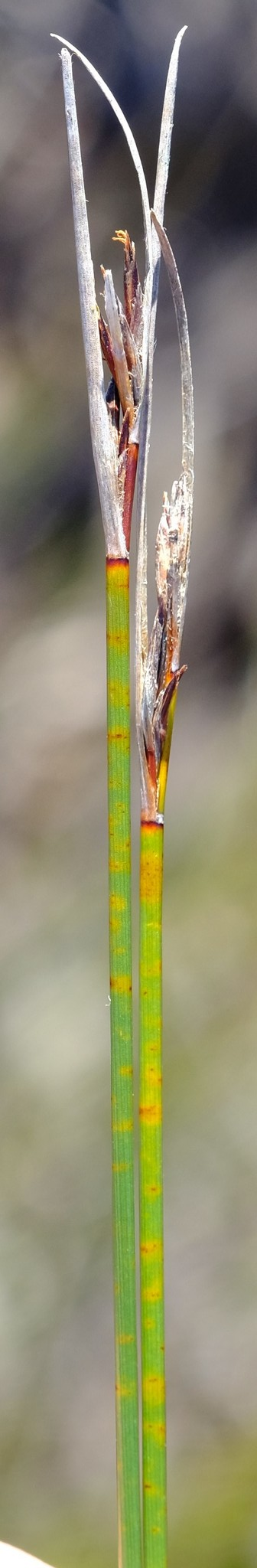
Inflorescences (flowering heads)
