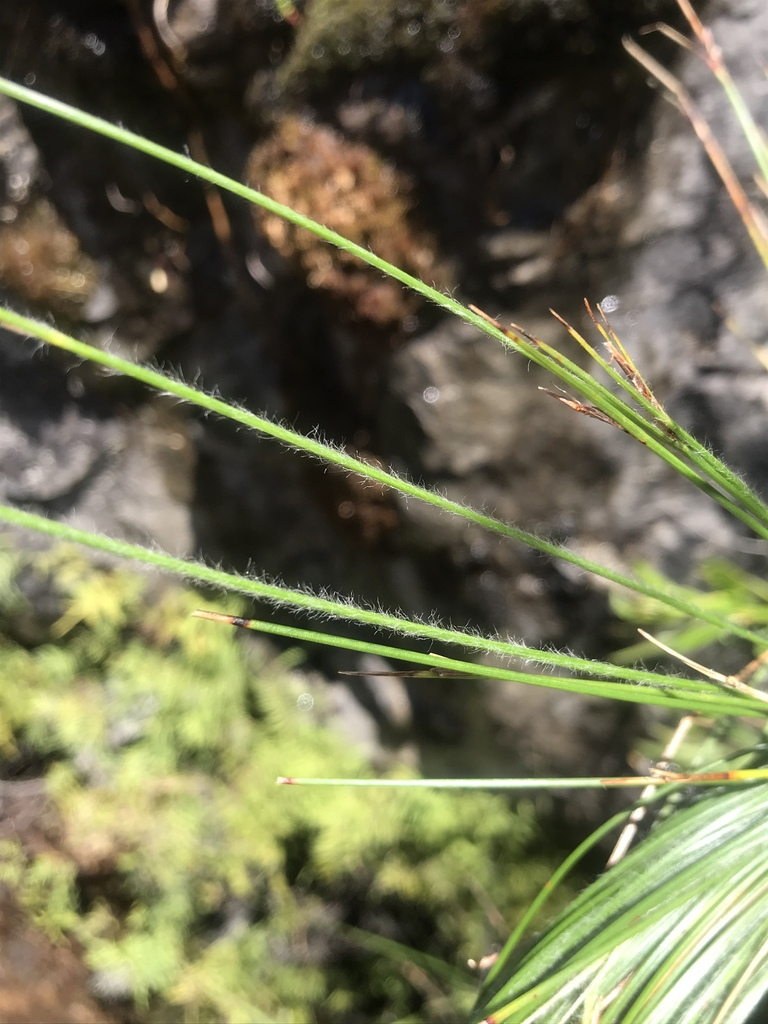
- Downy veldrush

Scientific classification
- Kingdom: Plantae
- Clade: Tracheophytes
- Clade: Angiosperms
- Clade: Monocots
- Clade: Commelinids
- Order: Poales
- Family: Cyperaceae
- Genus: Schoenus
- Species: S. crinitus

Binomial name
- Schoenus crinitus T.L.Elliott & Muasya
- Documented collection localities in South Africa

= Schoenus crinitus =

Species of grass-like plant

Schoenus crinitus is a species of sedge endemic to the Worcester region of the Western Cape Province of South Africa.

== Description ==
Similar to Schoenus adnatus, Schoenus gracillimus and Schoenus schonlandii, the inflorescence of S. crinitus has few, dispersed spikelets. The spikelets of S. crinitus are not pendulous (hanging), such as often occurs in S. gracillimus.

Schoenus crinitus is a more hairy and rigid species compared to S. adnatus and S. gracillimus. As opposed to S. adnatus, S. crinitus does not have spikelet receptacles that are adnate to the basal glume (bract).

Schoenus lucidus and Schoenus neovillosus also have hairy spikelets and culms (flowering stems), but the spikes of these two species are appressed between the two major bracts of the inflorescence. In contrast, the inflorescence bracts of S. crinitus are relatively narrow and the inflorescences display more lateral branching. Another major difference is that the culms of S. crinitus have deeper ridges compared to the nearly round culms of S. lucidus and S. neovillosus.

The tendency of southern African Schoenus to form hybrids with each other might partially explain some of the difficulties in identifying them. Recent research shows that S. crinitus is likely diploid and not of recent polyploid origin.

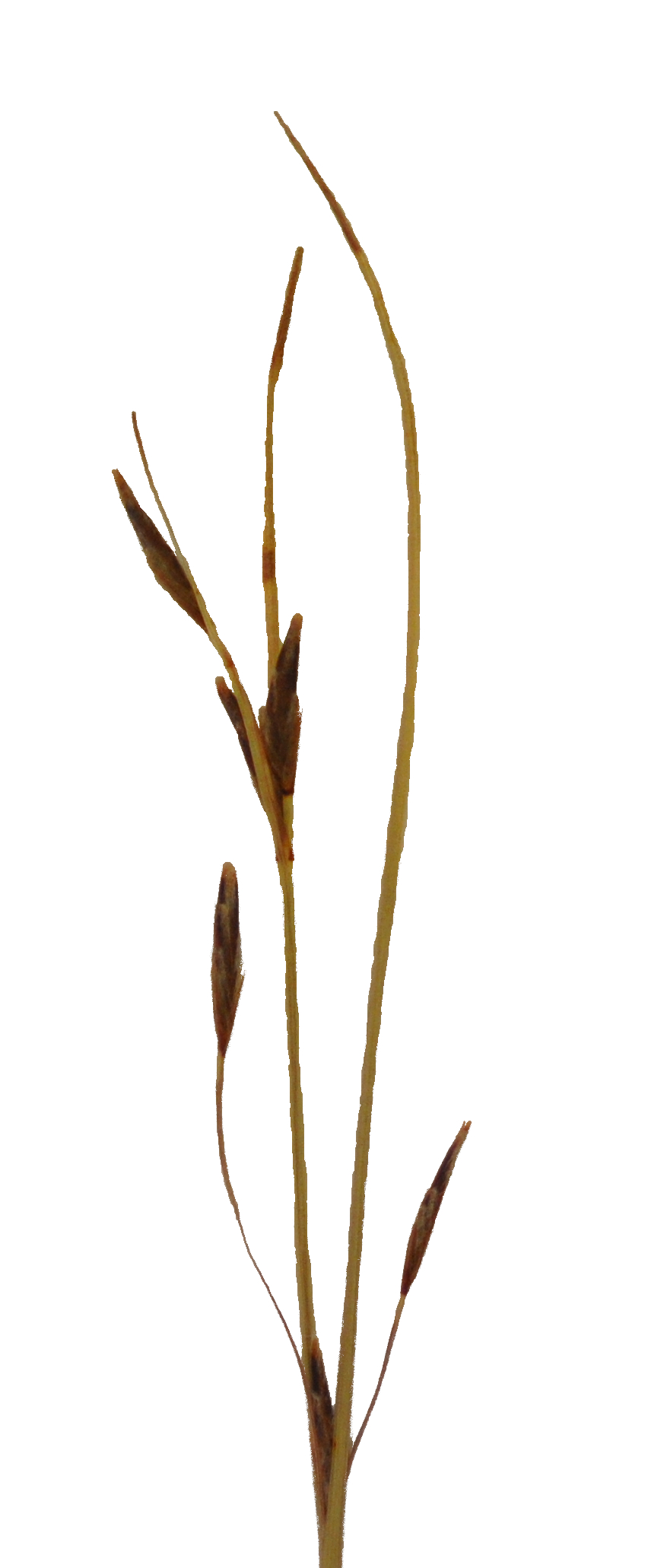
Flowering head (inflorescence)

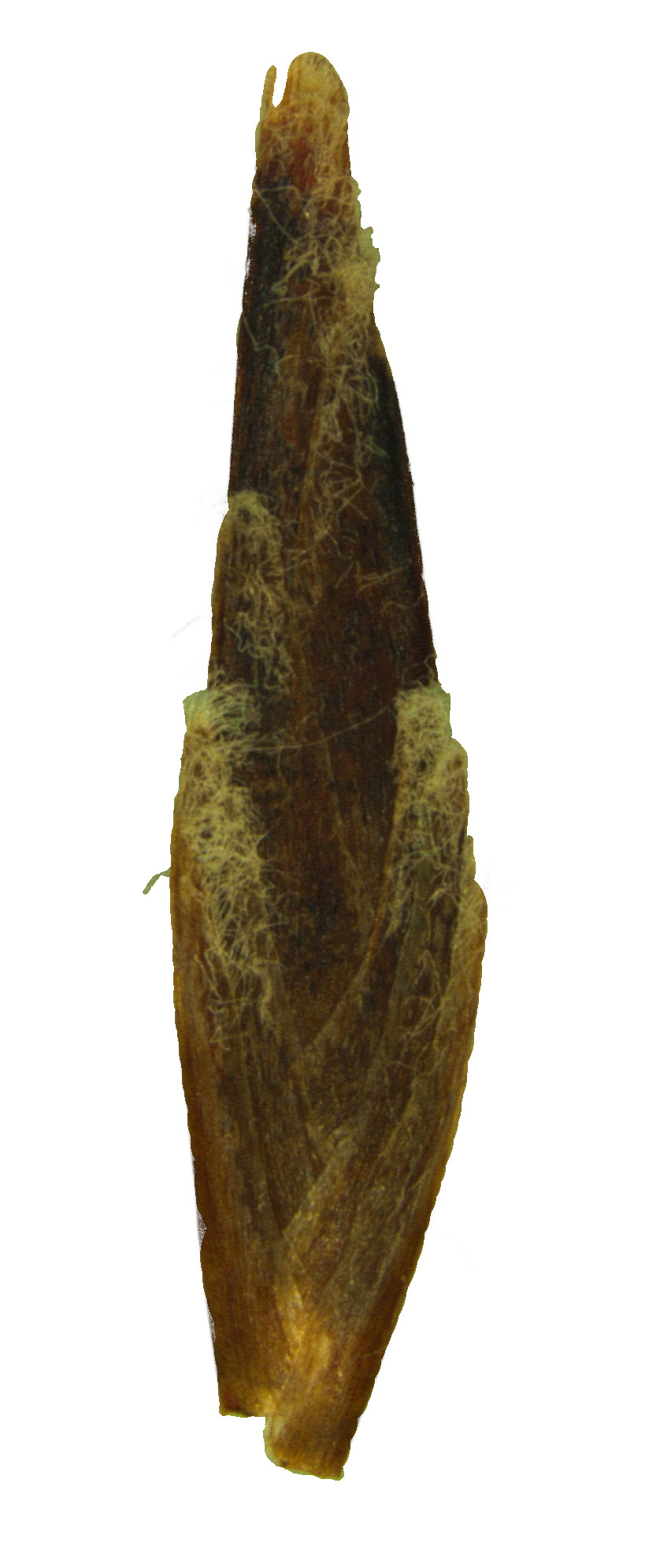
Spikelet

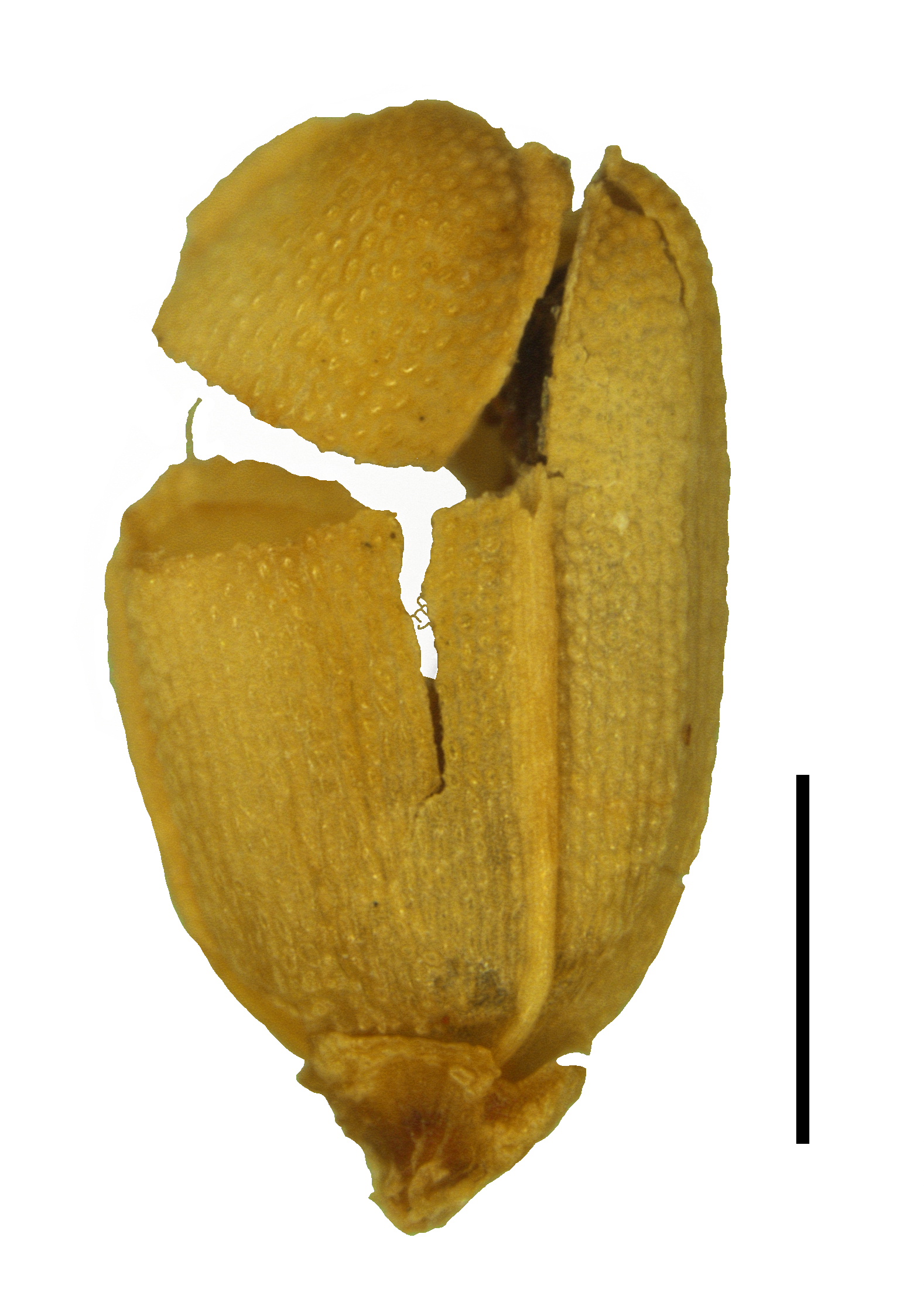
Broken nutlet (the black scale bar represents 1 mm)

== Taxonomy ==
Schoenus crinitus is a species in family Cyperaceae, tribe Schoeneae. This tribe includes other notable genera such as Costularia, Gahnia, Lepidosperma, Oreobolus and Tetraria. Phylogenetic and morphological evidence suggests that the closest relative to S. crinitus are species in the Epischoenus group.

The genus Tetraria once included species from the southern African Schoenus; however, we now know that the two groups are evolutionary distinct based on morphological and molecular differences. Several species of Epischoenus and the southern African Tetraria were transferred into Schoenus to ensure that the genus is monophyletic (i.e. the genus only has closely related species). In the field, the main distinguishing characters between Tetraria and Schoenus are the lack of stem leaves and absence of reticulate sheaths at the bases of the flowering stems in the latter genus.

== Distribution and habitat ==
Schoenus crinitus is known only from the mountain slopes of the Worcester region in the Western Cape Province of South Africa.
