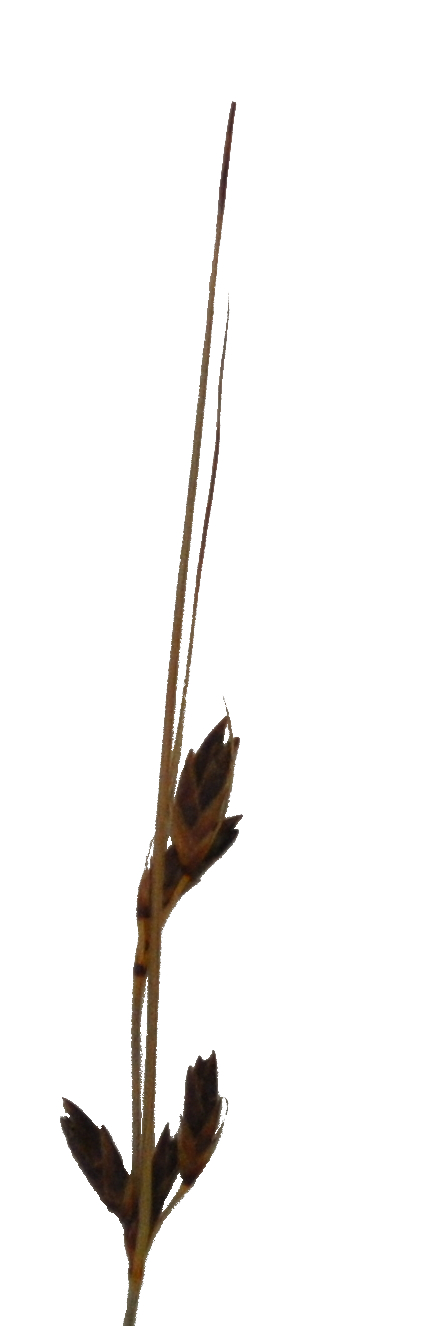
- Flat veldrush

Scientific classification
- Kingdom: Plantae
- Clade: Tracheophytes
- Clade: Angiosperms
- Clade: Monocots
- Clade: Commelinids
- Order: Poales
- Family: Cyperaceae
- Genus: Schoenus
- Species: S. adnatus

Binomial name
- Schoenus adnatus (Levyns) T.L.Elliott & Muasya
- Documented collection localities in South Africa

Synonyms
- Elynanthus adnatus Levyns; Tetraria gracilis Turrill; Schoenus tenuellus T.L.Elliott & Muasya; non Schoenus gracilis Sw.

= Schoenus adnatus =

Species of grass-like plant

Schoenus adnatus is a species of sedge endemic to mountainous locations in southern regions of South Africa.

== Description ==
Schoenus adnatus is a species of southern African Schoenus that shares traits characteristic of the Epischoenus group of Schoenus.

The main important character distinguishing S. adnatus from other similar species is that the spikelet receptacle is adnate to the lowest (basal) glume (bract).

The growth forms of Schoenus gracillimus and Schoenus schonlandii similar to that of S. adnatus; however, neither of these two species have a spikelet receptacle that is adnate to the lowest glume.

Schoenus adnatus can sometimes be slightly hairy, but its spikelets and culms are much less hairy that those of Schoenus crinitus. Another difference between the two species is that the culms of the S. adnatus are narrower (≤ 5 mm) than those of S. crinitus (≥ 6mm).

The southern African Schoenus tend to form hybrids with each other, which partially explains why they can be difficult to identify. It is impossible to determine if S. adnatus forms hybrids with other southern African Schoenus species because of a lack of evidence.

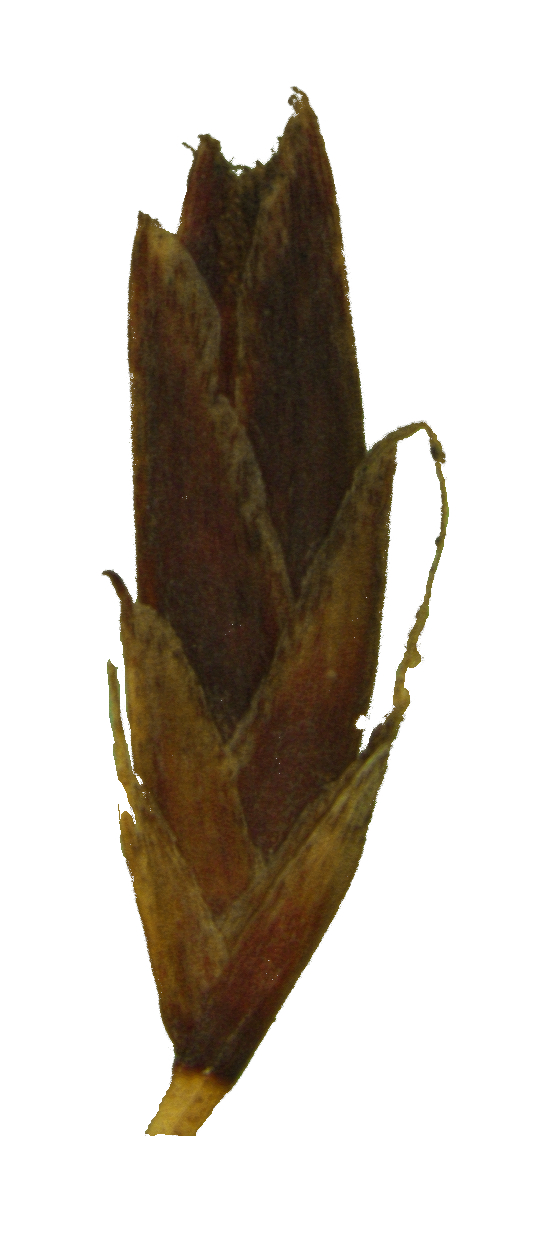
Spikelet (with receptacle adnate to lowest glume)

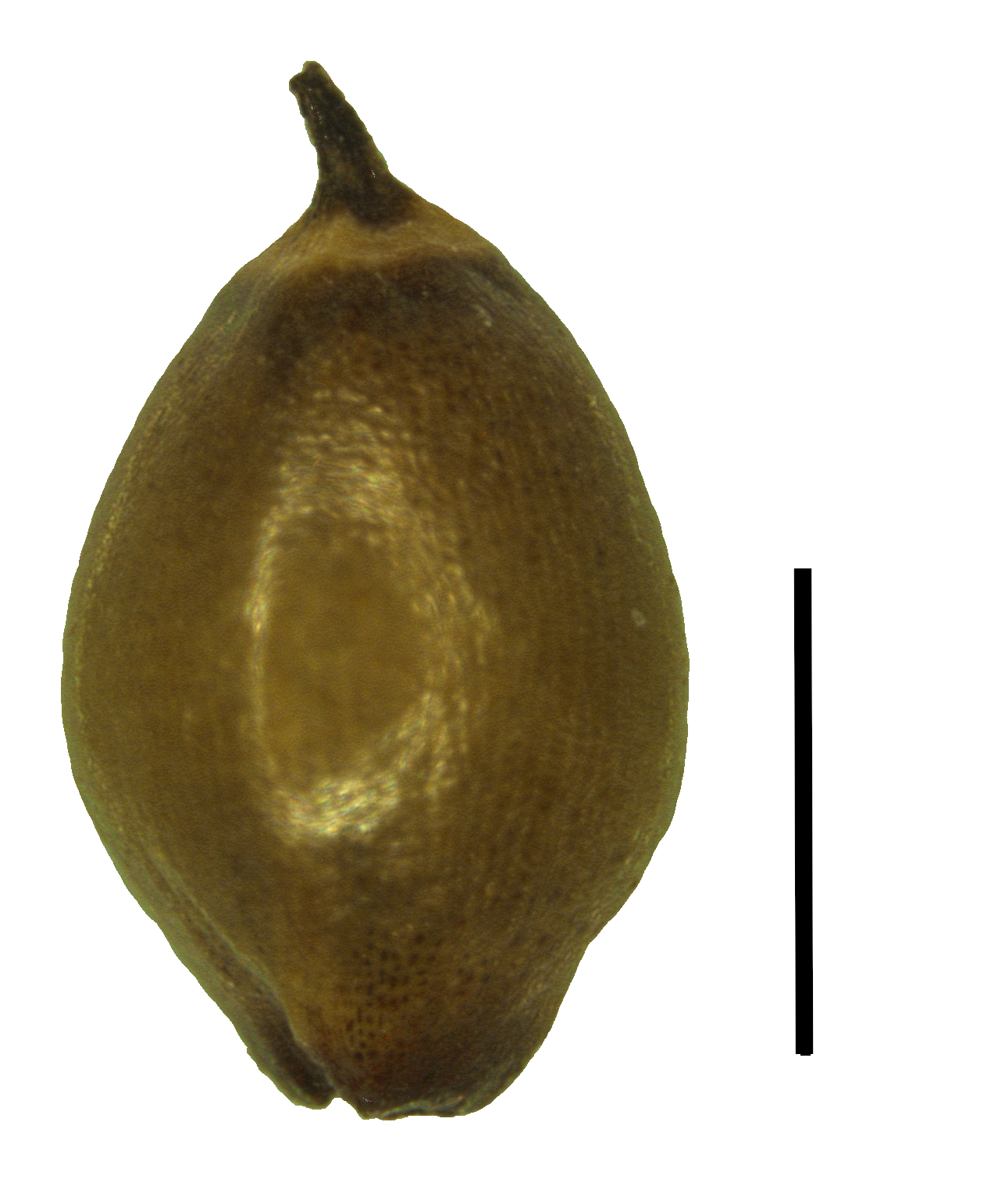
Nutlet (the black scale bar represents 1 mm)

== Taxonomy ==
Schoenus adnatus is a species in family Cyperaceae, tribe Schoeneae. Costularia, Gahnia, Lepidosperma, Oreobolus and Tetraria are other notable genera in tribe Schoeneae. Morphological evidence suggests that Schoenus adnatus is most closely related to other southern African Schoenus species, especially species in the Epischoenus group.

The southern African Schoenus were previously included within the genus Tetraria; however, we now know that the two groups are evolutionary distinct based on molecular and morphological differences. In 2017, several species of Epischoenus and the southern African Tetraria were transferred into Schoenus to ensure that this group of sedges is monophyletic (i.e. the genus only has closely related species). The southern African Schoenus can be distinguished from Tetraria species in the field by their lack of stem leaves and the absence of reticulate sheaths at the bases of the flowering stems.

Few recent field collections of S. adnatus exist, meaning that it has been impossible to study its evolutionary relationships with the Epischoenus group of Schoenus. Further material is needed to be able to reassess the taxonomy of this species.

== Distribution and habitat ==
Collections of Schoenus adnatus have been made from the Cape Peninsula in the Western Cape Province to the Steytlerville region in the Eastern Cape Province of South Africa.

Schoenus adnatus has primarily been collected from both moist and dry mountainous sites, ranging between 450 and 1375 m in elevation.
