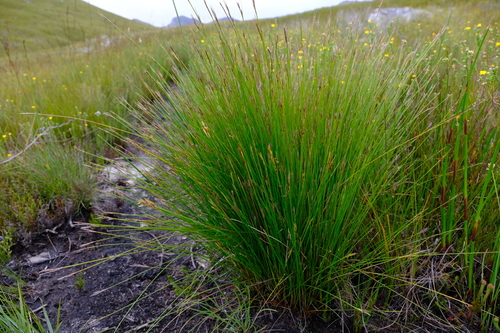
- Auricle veldrush

Scientific classification
- Kingdom: Plantae
- Clade: Tracheophytes
- Clade: Angiosperms
- Clade: Monocots
- Clade: Commelinids
- Order: Poales
- Family: Cyperaceae
- Genus: Schoenus
- Species: S. selinae

Binomial name
- Schoenus selinae T.L.Elliott, Muthaphuli & Muasya
- Documented collection localities in South Africa

= Schoenus selinae =

Species of grass-like plant

Schoenus selinae is a species of sedge endemic to the Western Cape Province and western areas of the Eastern Cape Province of South Africa.

== Description ==
Schoenus selinae is species with lateral papery extensions on its inflorescences (flowering stems), and it generally prefers wet mountainous habitats. The inflorescences usually have more than one cluster of spikelets, but when it does have only one spikelet cluster, it can resemble Schoenus pictus. The main differences between the two species is that S. pictus has leaves that arise from the base of its stems, whereas S. selinae lacks this character.

Schoenus pseudoloreus is a second species that resembles S. selinae, but the two differ in that S. pseudoloreus has leaves at the base of the stems, whereas the latter species lacks these leaves.

Other closely related species that lack leaves at the base of their stems and resemble S. selinae are Schoenus lucidus and Schoenus neovillosus. Whereas the culms and inflorescences of S. lucidus and S. neovillosus are partially hairy, S. selinae lacks hairs. Furthermore, the inflorescence bracts of S. selinae have membranaceous paper-like extensions, which are lacking in the other two species.

Similarities also exist between S. selinae and Schoenus rigidus, as both species have membranaceous paper-like extensions associated with their inflorescence bracts. The shape of the inflorescence of S. rigidus is more branched with the paper-like extensions only at the base of the spikelet clusters, whereas these extensions are present along a greater portion of the inflorescence length in S. selinae. In addition, the inflorescences of S. selinae appear more linear compared to the more branched ones of S. rigidus.

Certain species of southern African Schoenus might form hybrids with each other, which partially explains the difficulties in identifying these species. Recent research shows that S. selinae is likely diploid and not of recent polyploid origin, but more study is needed to confirm this.

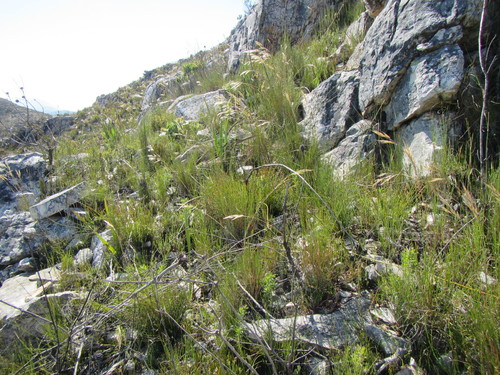
Population of S. selinae

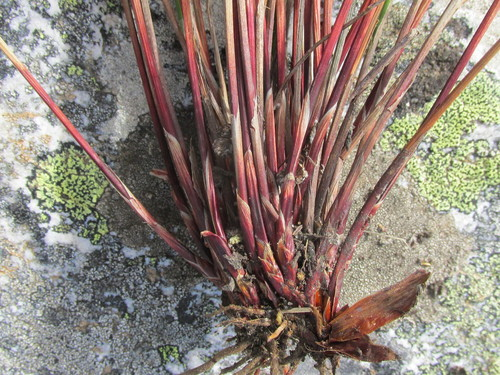
Base of flowering stems (culms)

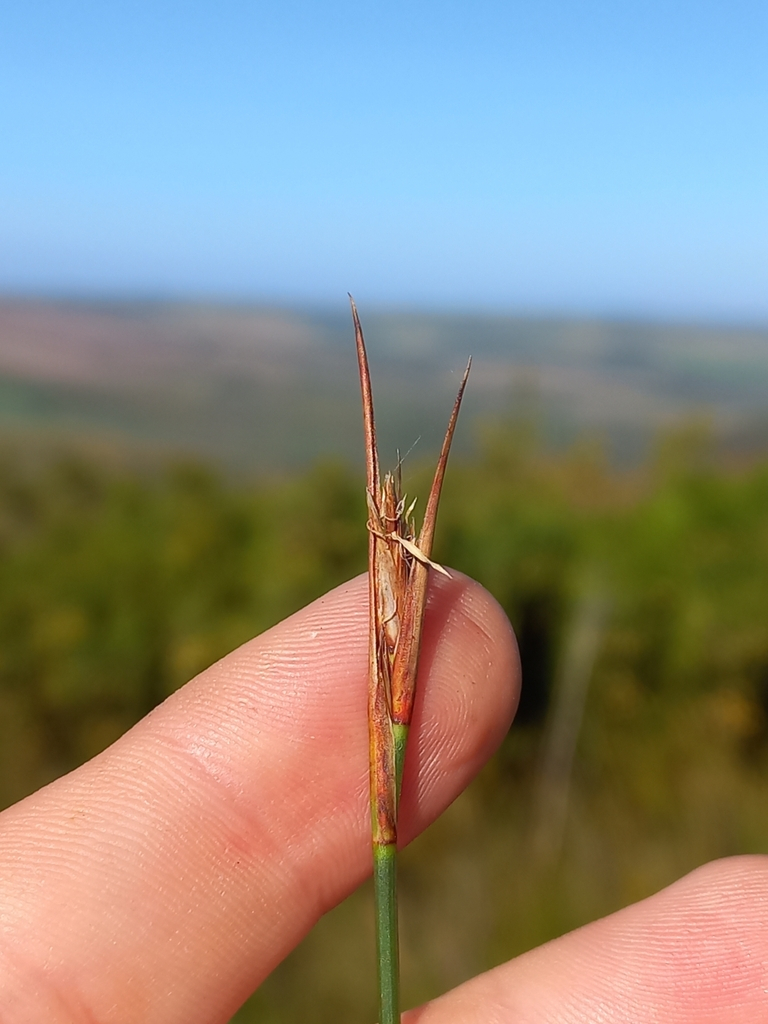
Flowering head (inflorescence)

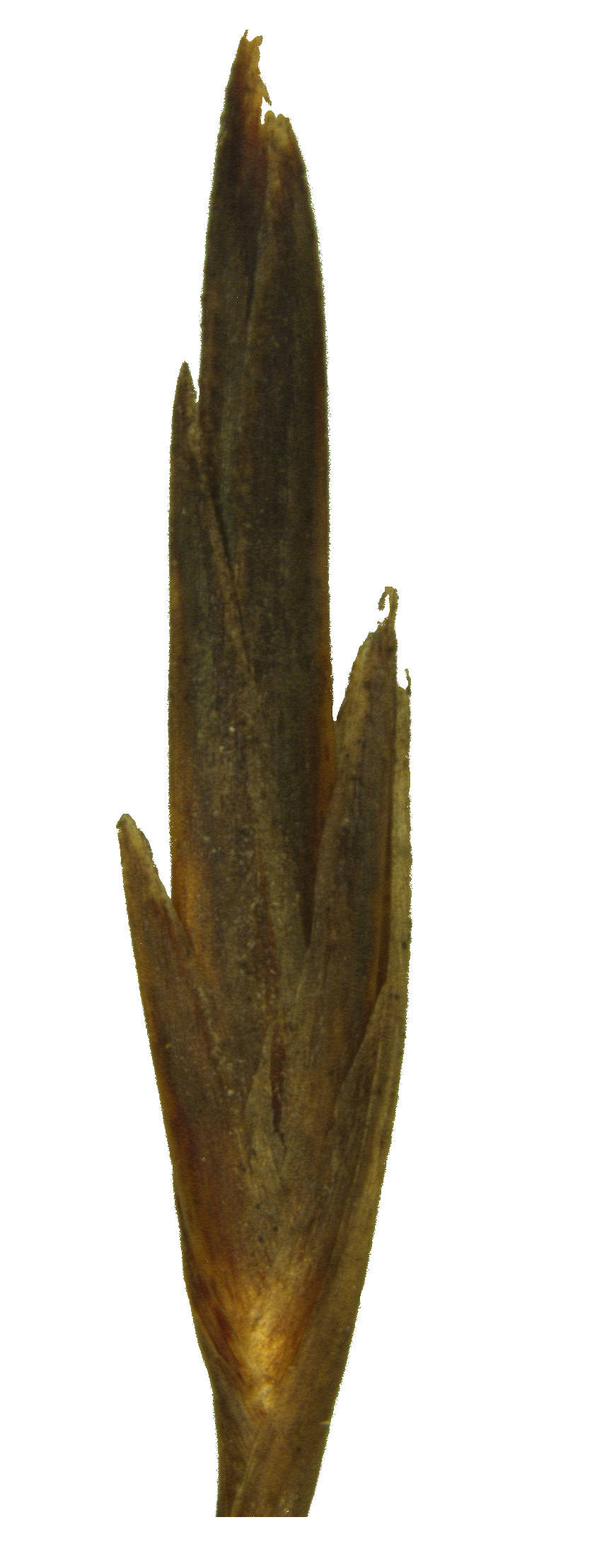
Spikelet (the black scale bar represents 1 mm)

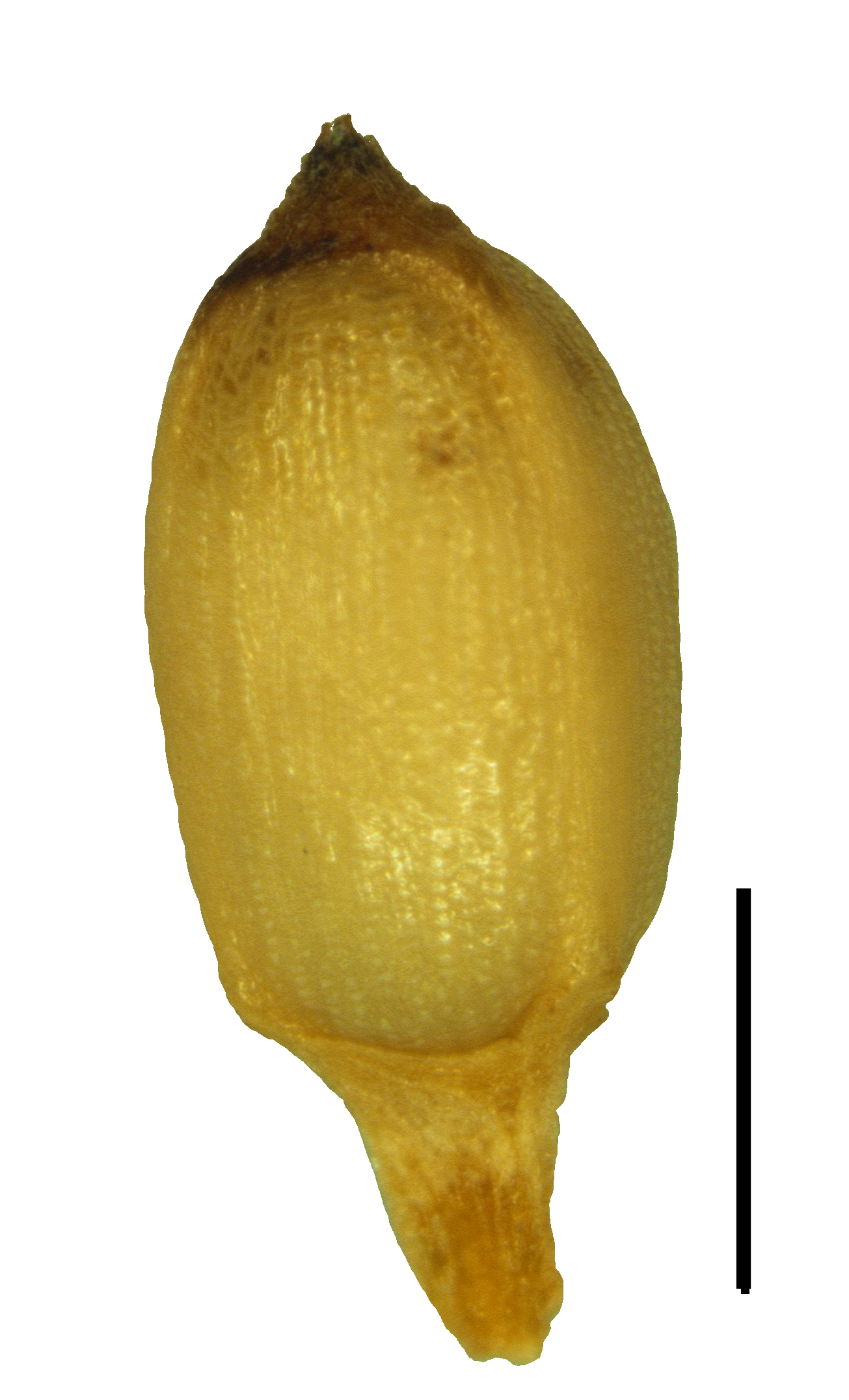
Nutlet (the black scale bar represents 1 mm)

== Taxonomy ==
Schoenus selinae is a species in family Cyperaceae, tribe Schoeneae. This tribe has other notable genera such as Costularia, Gahnia, Lepidosperma, Oreobolus and Tetraria. Phylogenetic and morphological evidence suggests that the closest relatives to S. selinae are species in the Epischoenus group of Schoenus.

The genus Tetraria once included species from the southern African Schoenus; however, we now know that the two groups are evolutionary distinct based on morphological and molecular differences.

To ensure that Schoenus is monophyletic (i.e. the genus only has closely related species), several species of the southern African Tetraria and Epischoenus were transferred into Schoenus. The main distinguishing traits between Tetraria and Schoenus in the field are the lack of stem leaves and absence of reticulate sheaths at the bases of the flowering stems in Schoenus.

== Distribution and habitat ==
The known distribution of S. selinae ranges from the Cederberg Mountains in the Western Cape Province to the Humansdorp region in the Eastern Cape Province of South Africa. The known elevation range of this species is between 150 and 1700 metres, and it occurs generally on wet mountainous sites with a couple of collections made from forest margins.

== Gallery ==
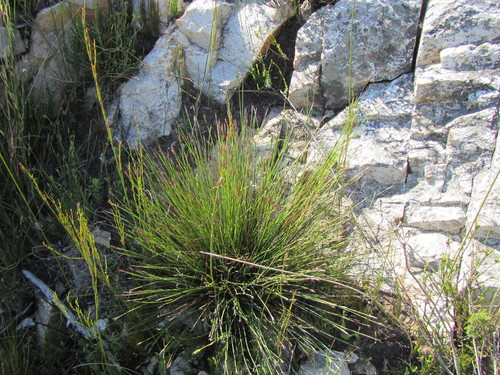
Growth form

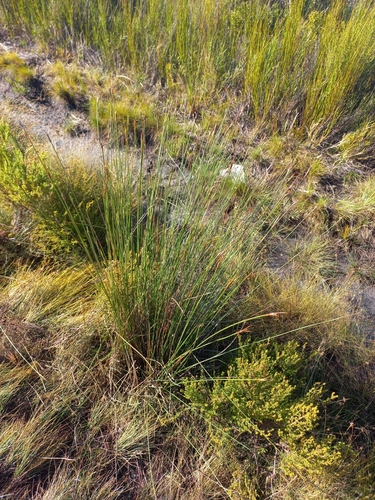
Growth form

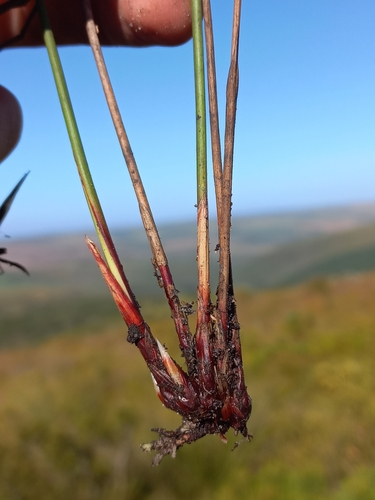
Flowering stem (culm) bases

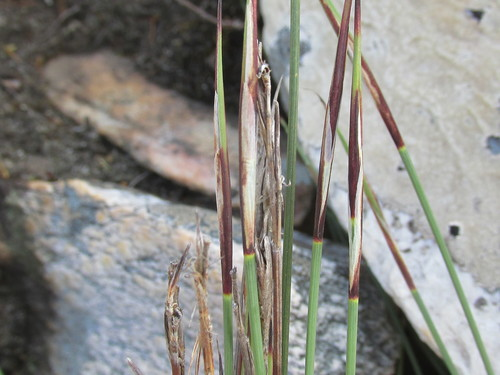
Flowering heads

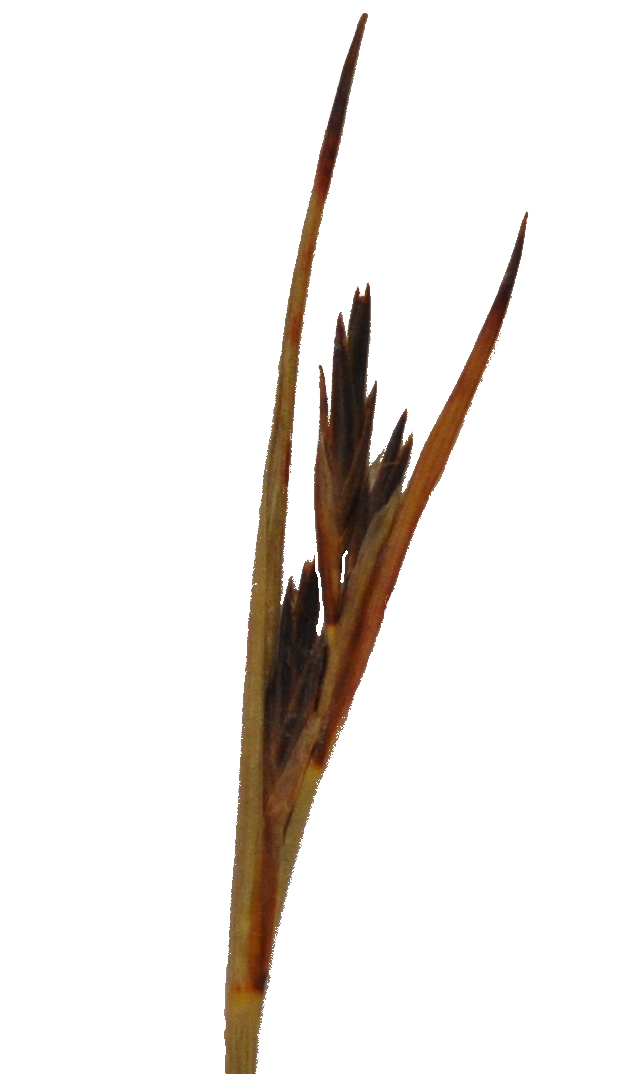
Inflorescence (flowering head)

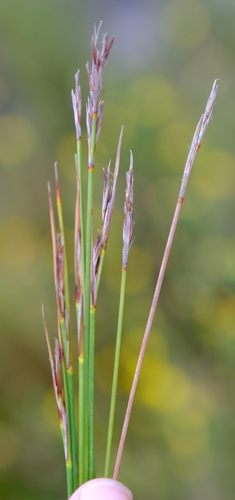
Inflorescences
