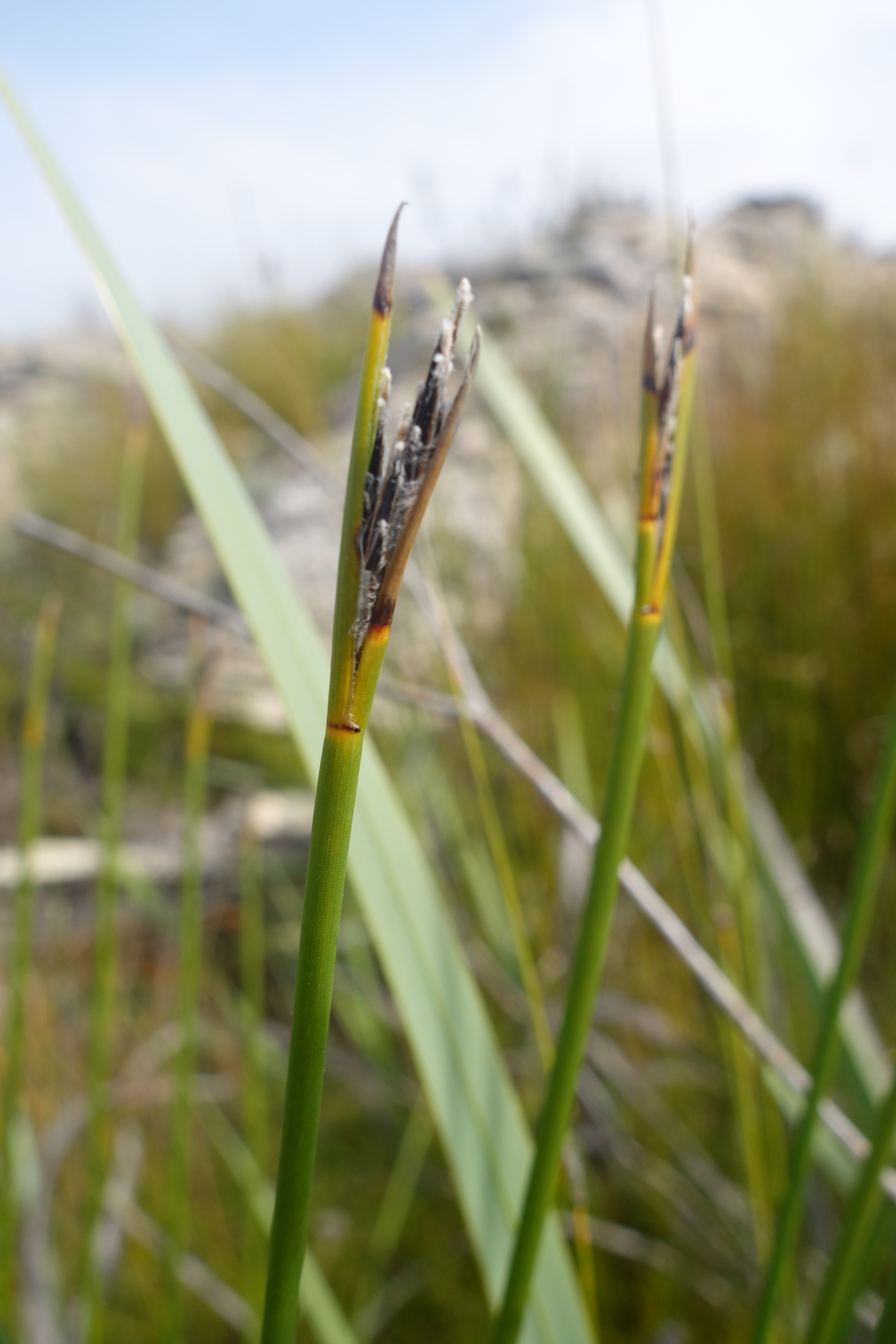
- Bright veldrush

Scientific classification
- Kingdom: Plantae
- Clade: Tracheophytes
- Clade: Angiosperms
- Clade: Monocots
- Clade: Commelinids
- Order: Poales
- Family: Cyperaceae
- Genus: Schoenus
- Species: S. lucidus

Binomial name
- Schoenus lucidus (C.B.Clarke) T.L.Elliott & Muasya
- Documented collection localities in South Africa

Synonyms
- Tetraria lucida C.B.Clarke; Epischoenus lucidus (C.B.Clarke) Levyns; Epischoenus eriophorus Levyns

= Schoenus lucidus =

Species of grass-like plant

Schoenus lucidus is a species of sedge endemic to the western mountains of the Western Cape province of South Africa.

== Description ==
The inflorescence of Schoenus lucidus is composed of congested, overlapping spikes and spikelets. This character contrasts with the inflorescences of Schoenus crinitus and Schoenus gracillimus, which have spikelets that are more dispersed throughout the inflorescence.

The spikelets and often partially the culms of S. lucidus are hairy. Other species of southern African Schoenus that are hairy include S. crinitus, Schoenus neovillosus and sometimes S. gracillimus, but these three species often have different growth and spikelet forms compared to S. lucidus. In addition, the proximal rachis, proximal primary inflorescence bracts (glumes) and the inflorescence of S. lucidus are generally shorter than those of S. neovillosus.

The tendency of southern African Schoenus to form hybrids with each other could partially explain the difficulties in identifying these species. It is not clear whether S. lucidus forms hybrids with other southern African Schoenus species.

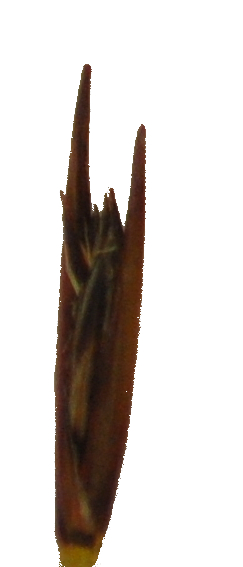
Flowering head

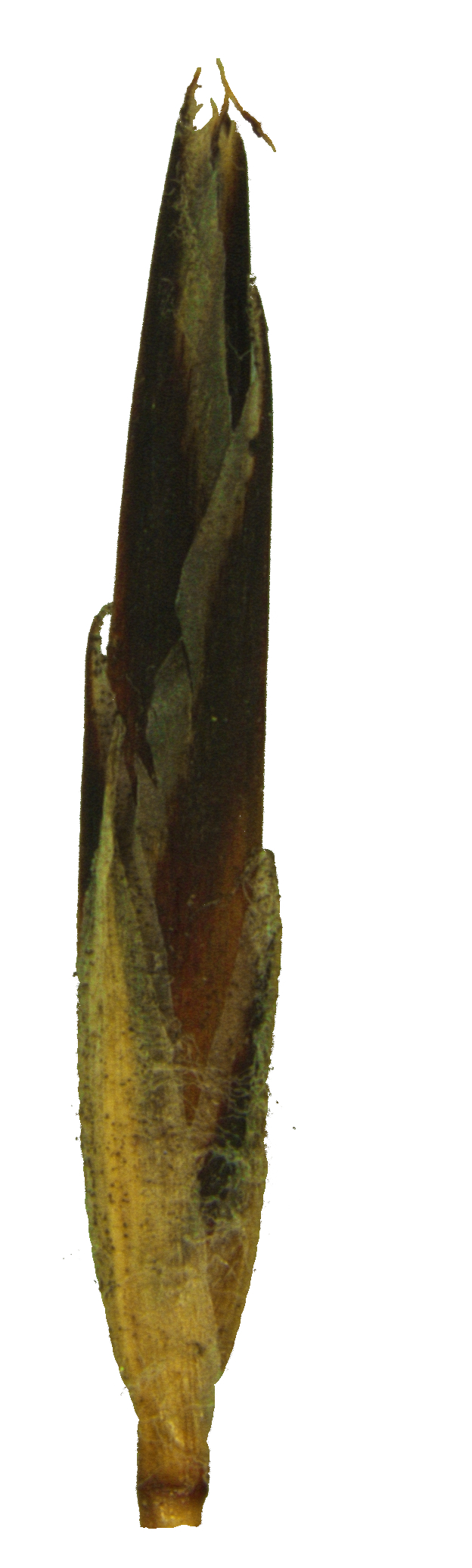
Spikelet

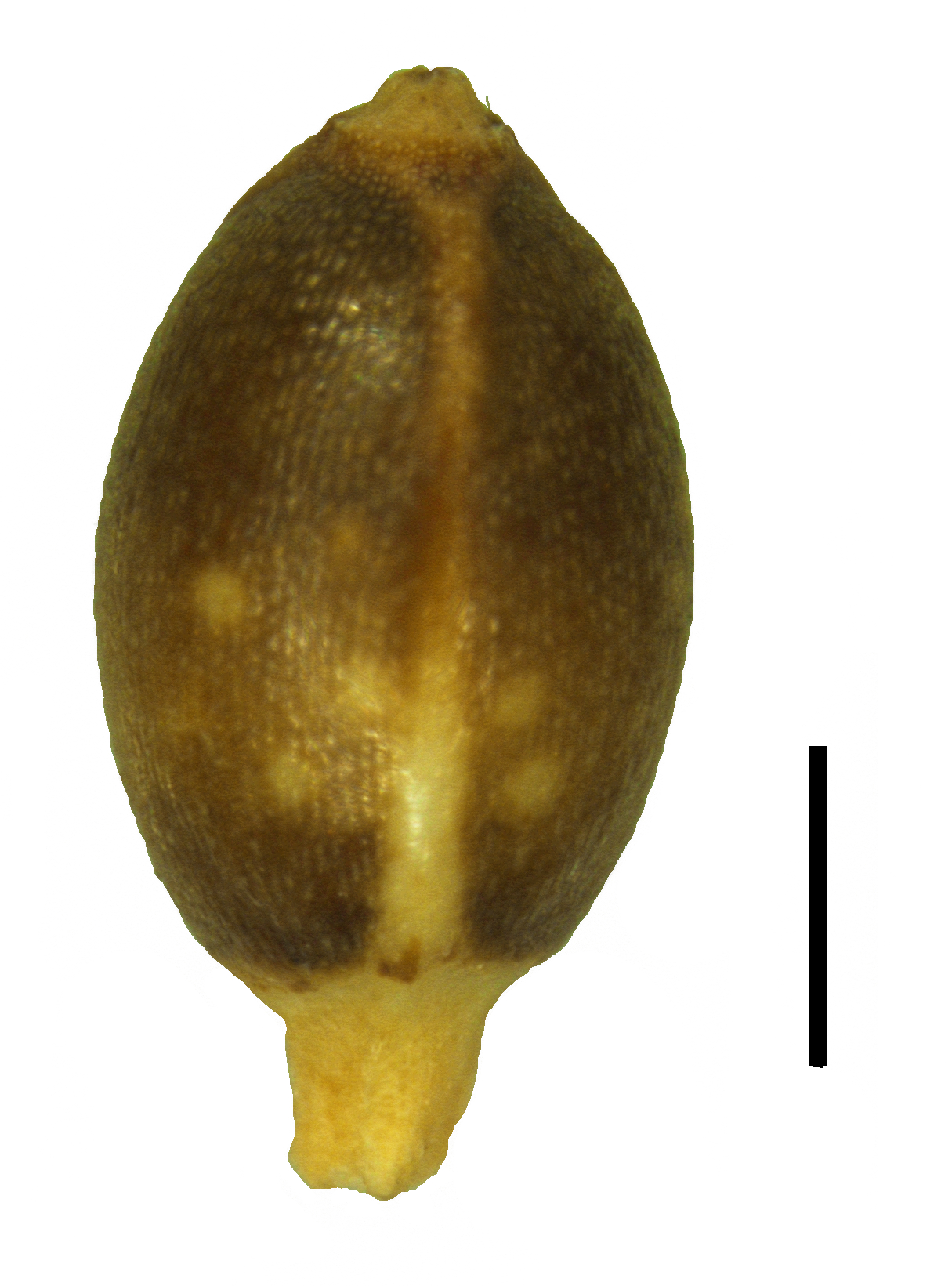
Nutlet (the black scale bar represents 1 mm)

== Taxonomy ==
Schoenus lucidus is a species in family Cyperaceae, tribe Schoeneae. Other notable genera in this tribe include Costularia, Gahnia, Lepidosperma, Oreobolus and Tetraria. Based on phylogenetic and morphological evidence, species in the Epischoenus group are the closest relatives to S. lucidus.

The genus Tetraria once included species from the southern African Schoenus; however, scientific evidence now shows that the two groups are evolutionary distinct based on molecular and morphological. Thus, several species of Epischoenus and the southern African Tetraria were transferred into Schoenus to ensure that the genus is monophyletic (i.e. the genus only has closely related species). In the field, the main distinguishing characters between Tetraria and Schoenus are the lack of stem leaves and absence of reticulate sheaths at the bases of the flowering stems in species of Schoenus.

== Distribution and habitat ==
The mountains of the Worcester and Ceres regions of the Western Cape province are the centers of diversity of S. lucidus, with collection locations ranging between 900 and 1700 m. This is a species that can survive in both wet and dry mountainous habitats.

== Gallery ==
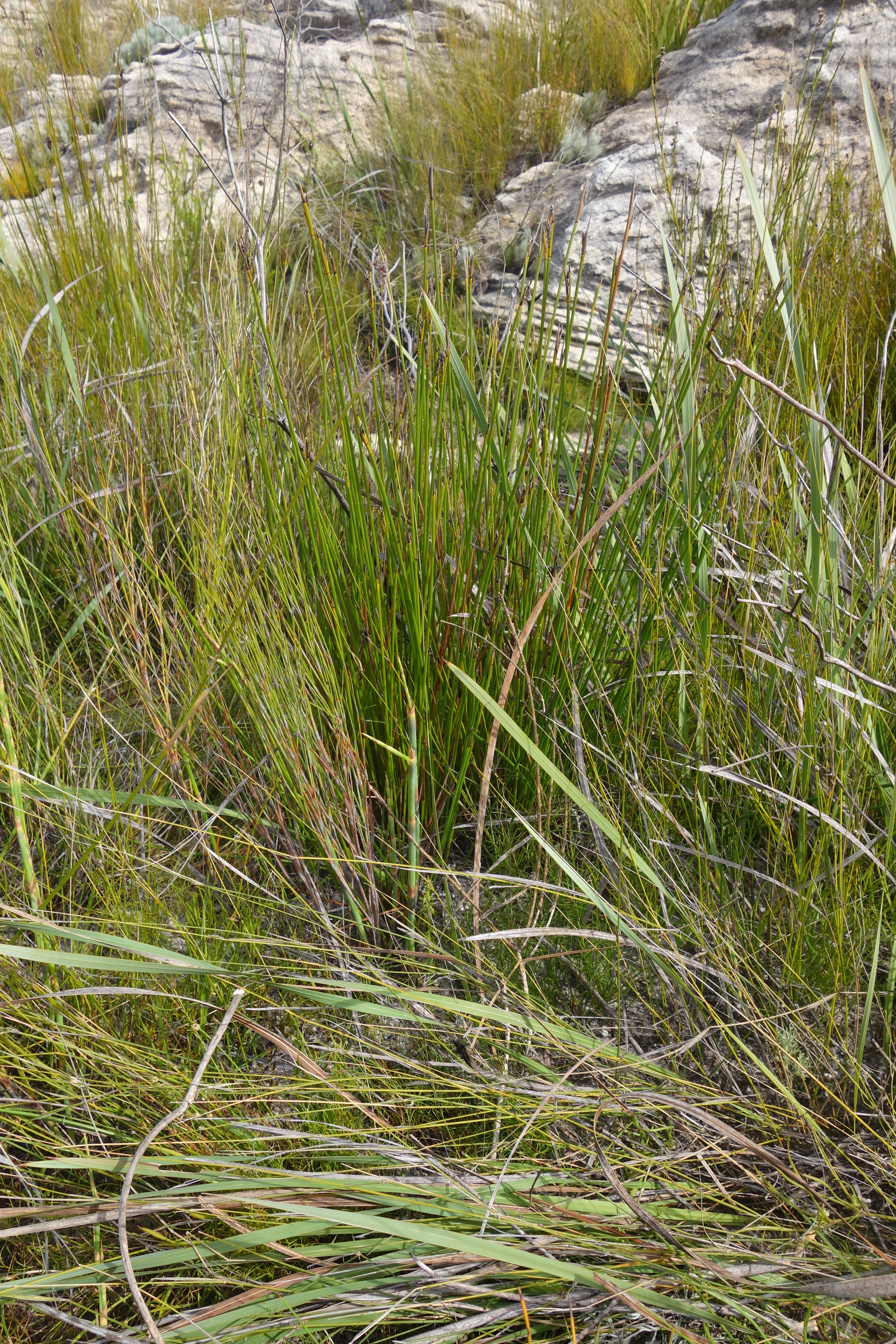
Growth form
