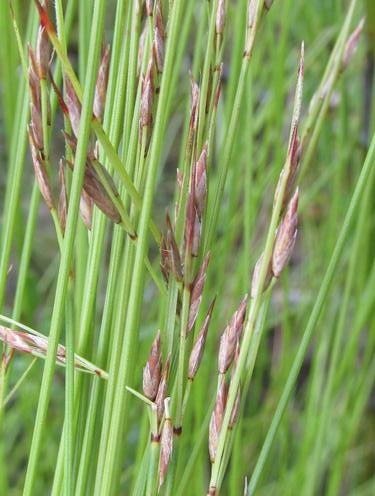
- Eastern veldrush

Scientific classification
- Kingdom: Plantae
- Clade: Tracheophytes
- Clade: Angiosperms
- Clade: Monocots
- Clade: Commelinids
- Order: Poales
- Family: Cyperaceae
- Genus: Schoenus
- Species: S. schonlandii

Binomial name
- Schoenus schonlandii (Turrill) T.L.Elliott & Muasya
- Documented collection localities in South Africa

Synonyms
- Tetraria schonlandii Turrill

= Schoenus schonlandii =

Species of grass-like plant

Schoenus schonlandii is a species of sedge endemic to locations near the southern coast of South Africa.

== Description ==
The flowering heads (inflorescences) of S. schonlandii resemble those of Schoenus adnatus, Schoenus crinitus and Schoenus gracillimus in form, as these species all have relatively few spikelets scattered throughout a panicle. Schoenus crinitus is more hairy than S. schonlandii, and it does not have spikelet receptacles that are adnate to the basal glumes (bracts), such as in S. adnatus. Compared to S. gracillimus, S. schonlandii grows farther to the east in South Africa, and it does not have the pendulous (hanging) spikelets that are often found in S. gracillimus.

Schoenus rigidus has inflorescences that resemble those of S. schonlandii, but the primary inflorescence bracts of S. schonlandii do not have the paper-like extensions that are found in S. rigidus.

The southern African Schoenus have a tendency to form hybrids with each other based on preliminary evidence, which partially explains why they can be difficult to identify. Since little is known about S. schonlandii because of a lack of collections and observations, it is unclear whether it forms hybrids with other southern African Schoenus species.

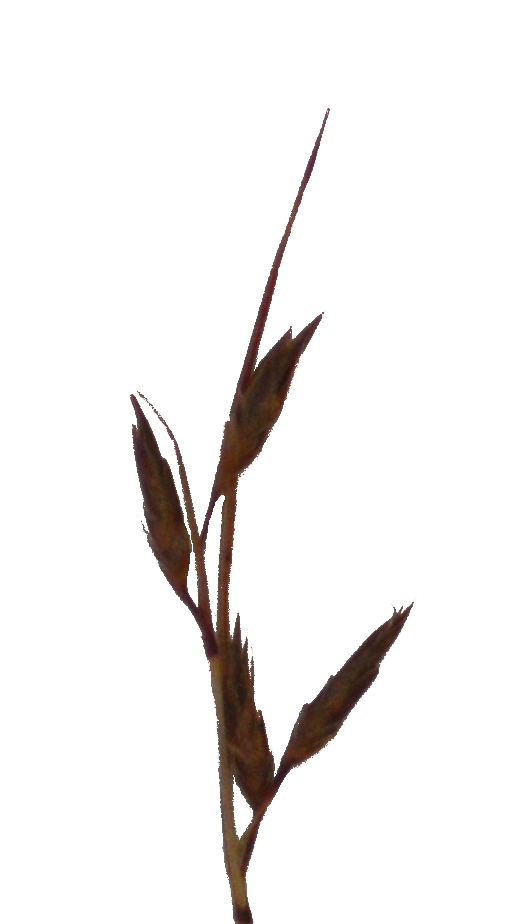
Flowering head

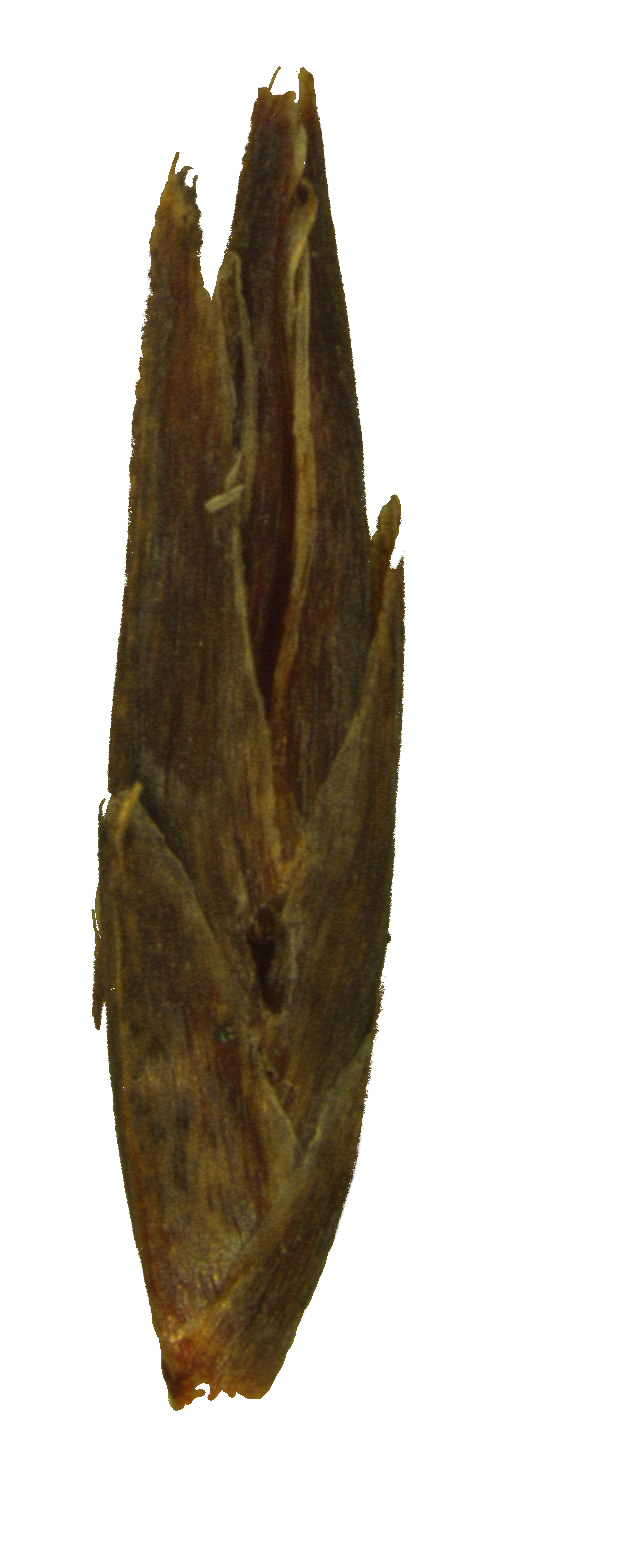
Spikelet

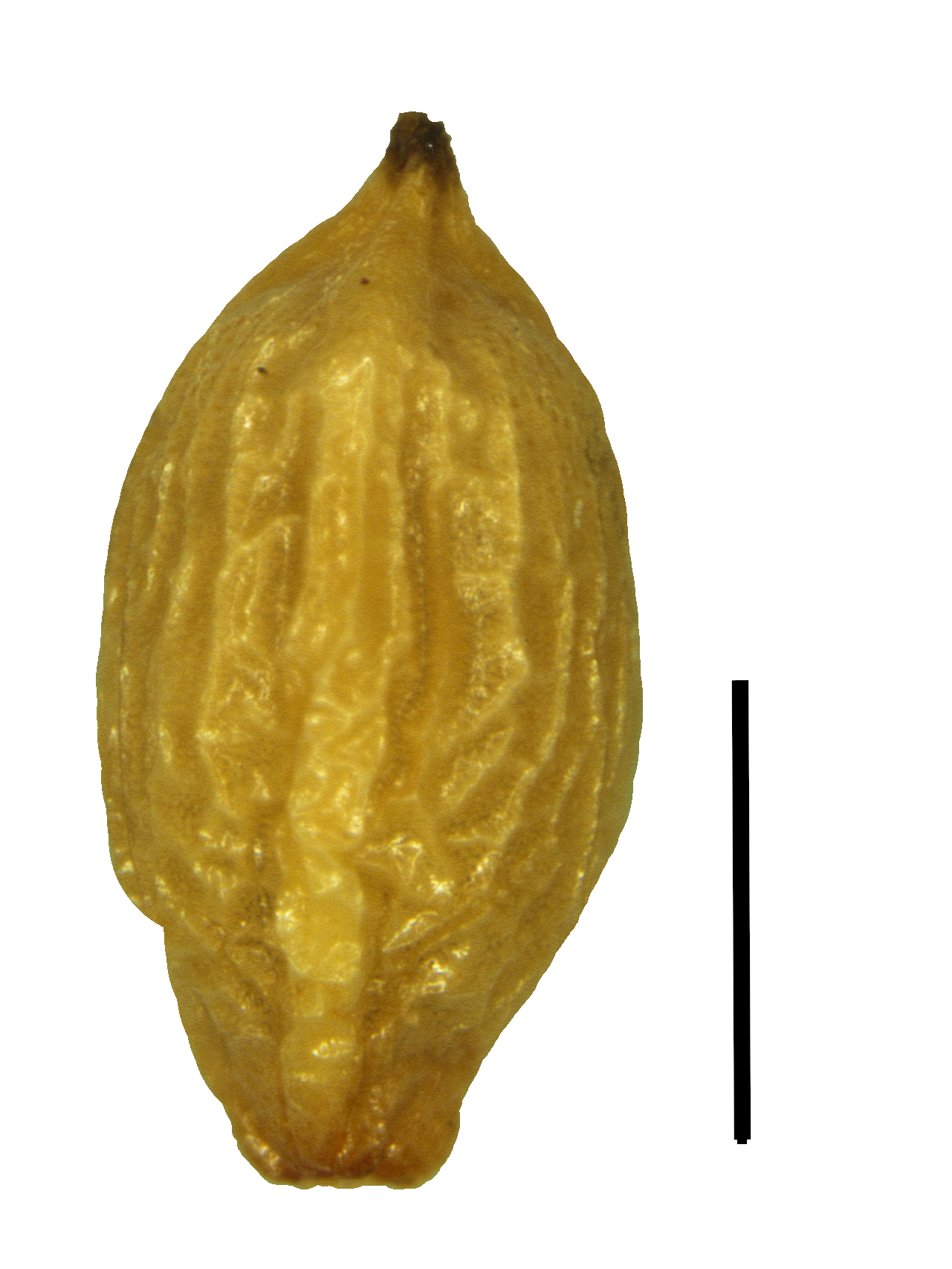
Nutlet (black scale bar is 1mm)

== Taxonomy ==
Schoenus schonlandii is a species in family Cyperaceae, tribe Schoeneae, which is a clade that includes genera such as Costularia, Gahnia, Lepidosperma, Oreobolus and Tetraria. Other species in the Epischoenus group of southern African Schoenus are likely to be the most closely related species to S. schonlandii based on morphological similarities among species.

Species from the southern African Schoenus were once included in the genus Tetraria; however, both molecular and morphological evidence suggests that the two genera are evolutionary distinct. To ensure that this group of sedges is monophyletic (i.e. the genus only has closely related species), the southern African Tetraria were transferred into Schoenus. The southern African Schoenus can be distinguished from Tetraria species in the field by their lack of stem leaves and the absence of reticulate sheaths at the bases of the flowering stems.

== Distribution and habitat ==
The recorded distribution of Schoenus schonlandii ranges from the Zuurberg area in the east to the George area in the west, generally near the southern coast of South Africa. Collections of this species have been made from dry slopes, ridges and bushy places from elevations near 100 m to nearly 1700.
