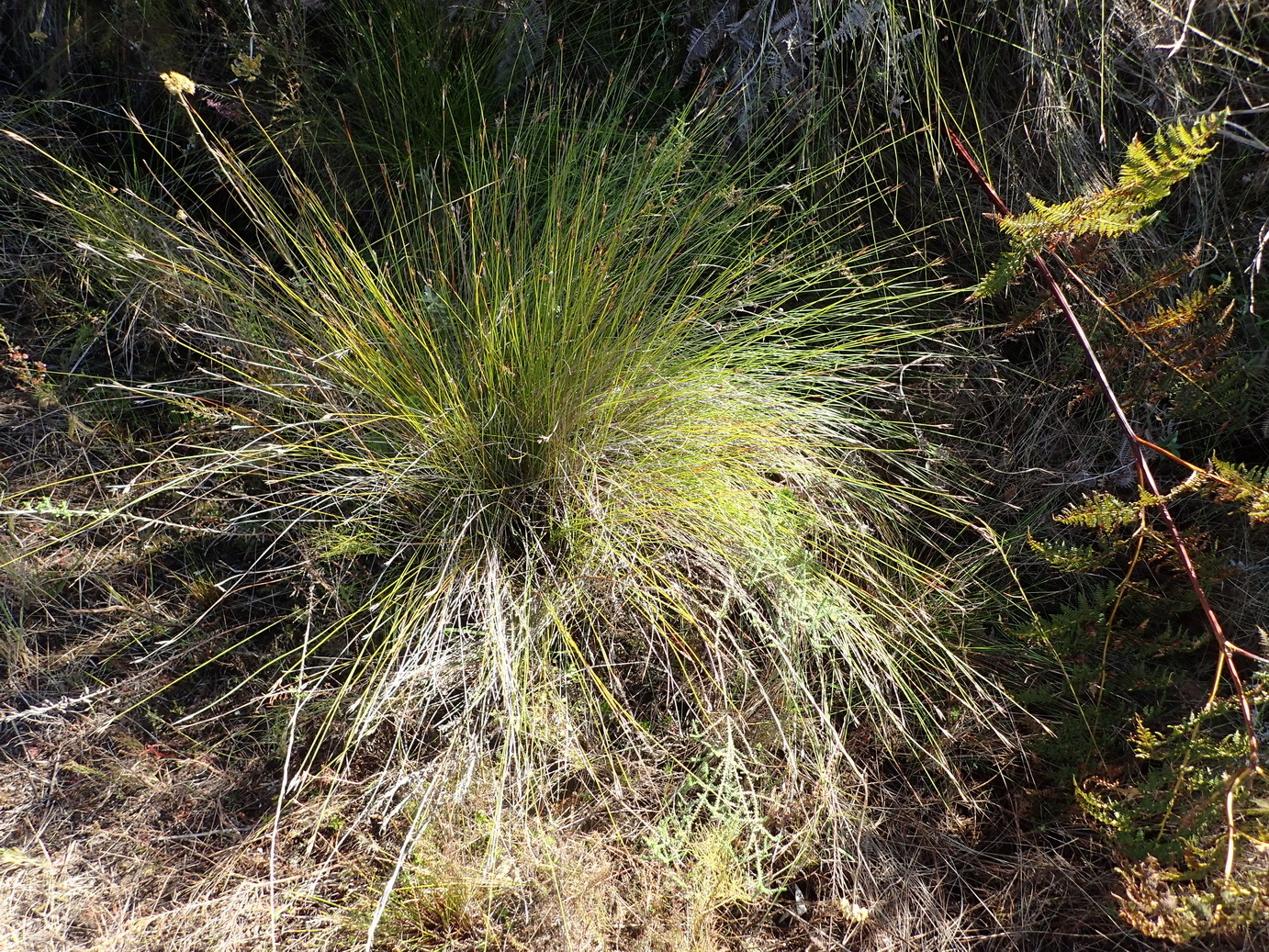
- Ridge veldrush

Scientific classification
- Kingdom: Plantae
- Clade: Tracheophytes
- Clade: Angiosperms
- Clade: Monocots
- Clade: Commelinids
- Order: Poales
- Family: Cyperaceae
- Genus: Schoenus
- Species: S. rigidus

Binomial name
- Schoenus rigidus T.L.Elliott & Muasya
- Documented collection localities in South Africa

= Schoenus rigidus =

Species of grass-like plant

Schoenus rigidus is a species of sedge endemic to locations near central regions of the southern coast of South Africa.

== Description ==
The inflorescences (flowering heads) of Schoenus rigidus and Schoenus schonlandii are similar, but the primary inflorescence bracts of S. rigidus have membranaceous paper-like extensions that are absent in S. schonlandii.

Another species similar in form and also having membraneous paper-like extensions on its primary inflorescence bracts is Schoenus selinae; however, the inflorescences of S. rigidus are more laterally branched compared to those of S. selinae.

The southern African Schoenus have a tendency to form hybrids with each other based on preliminary evidence, which partially explains why they can be difficult to identify. It is not yet known whether S. rigidus is diploid or polyploid, and whether it forms hybrids with other closely related species.

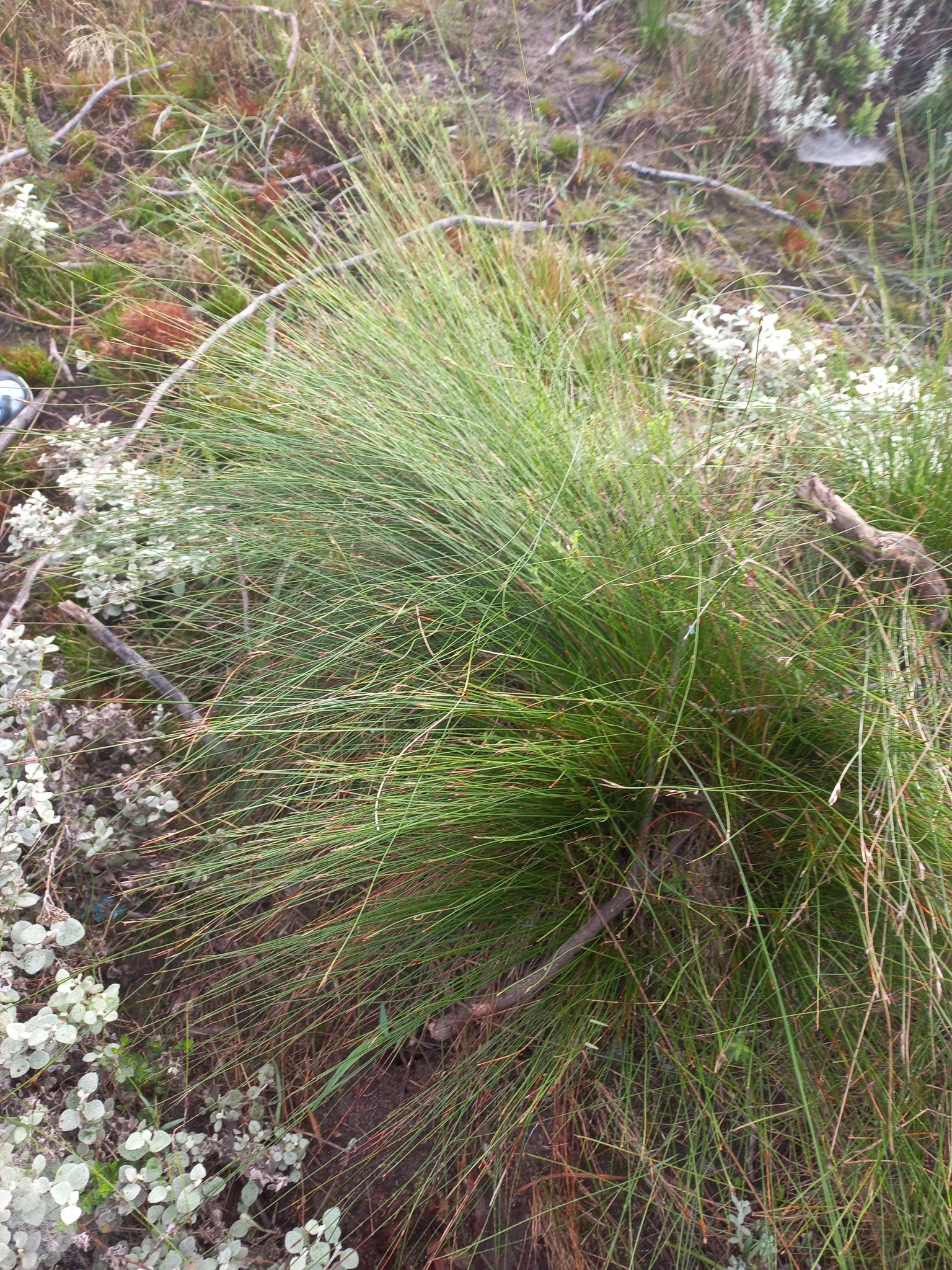
Growth form

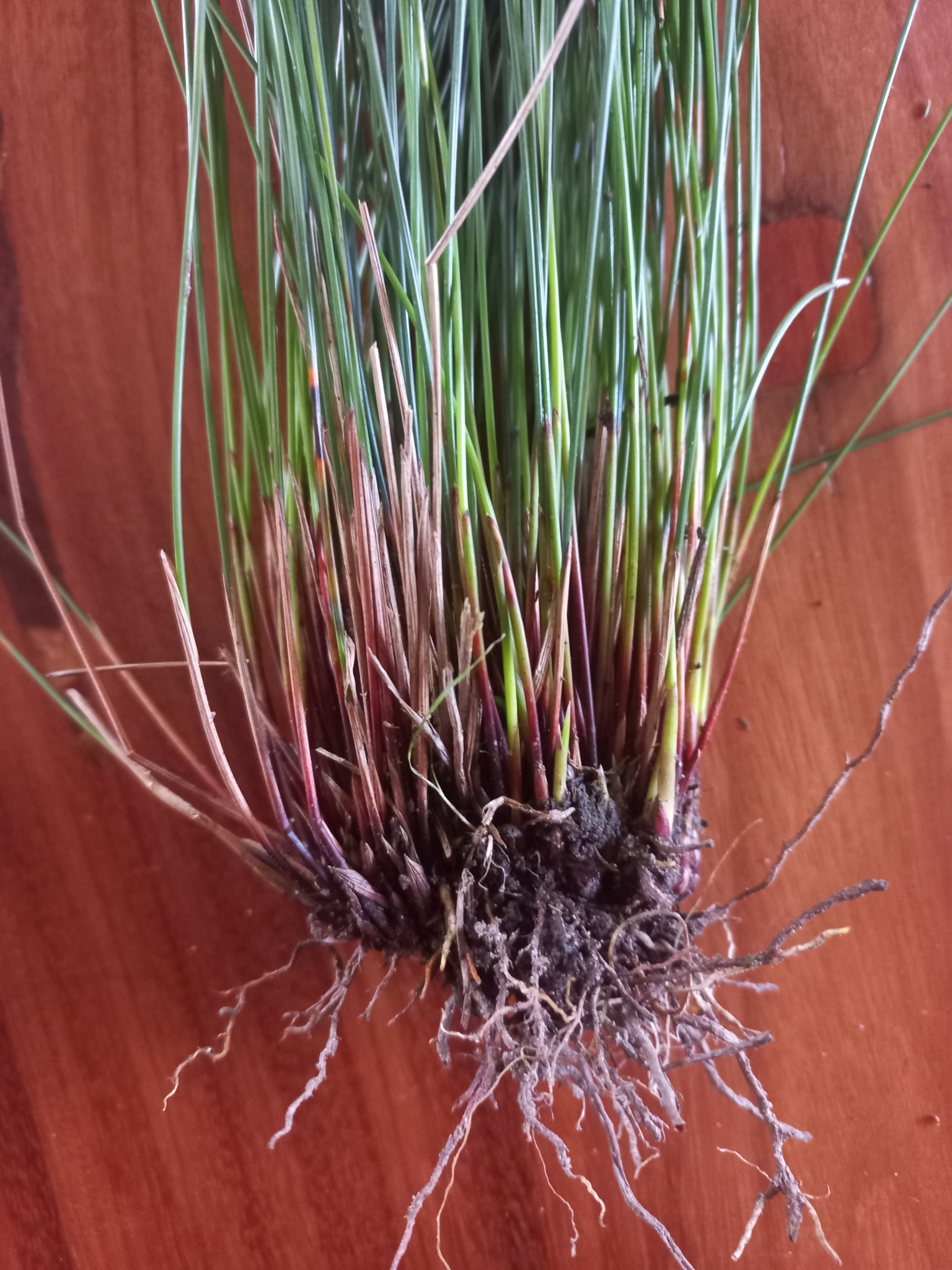
Stem bases

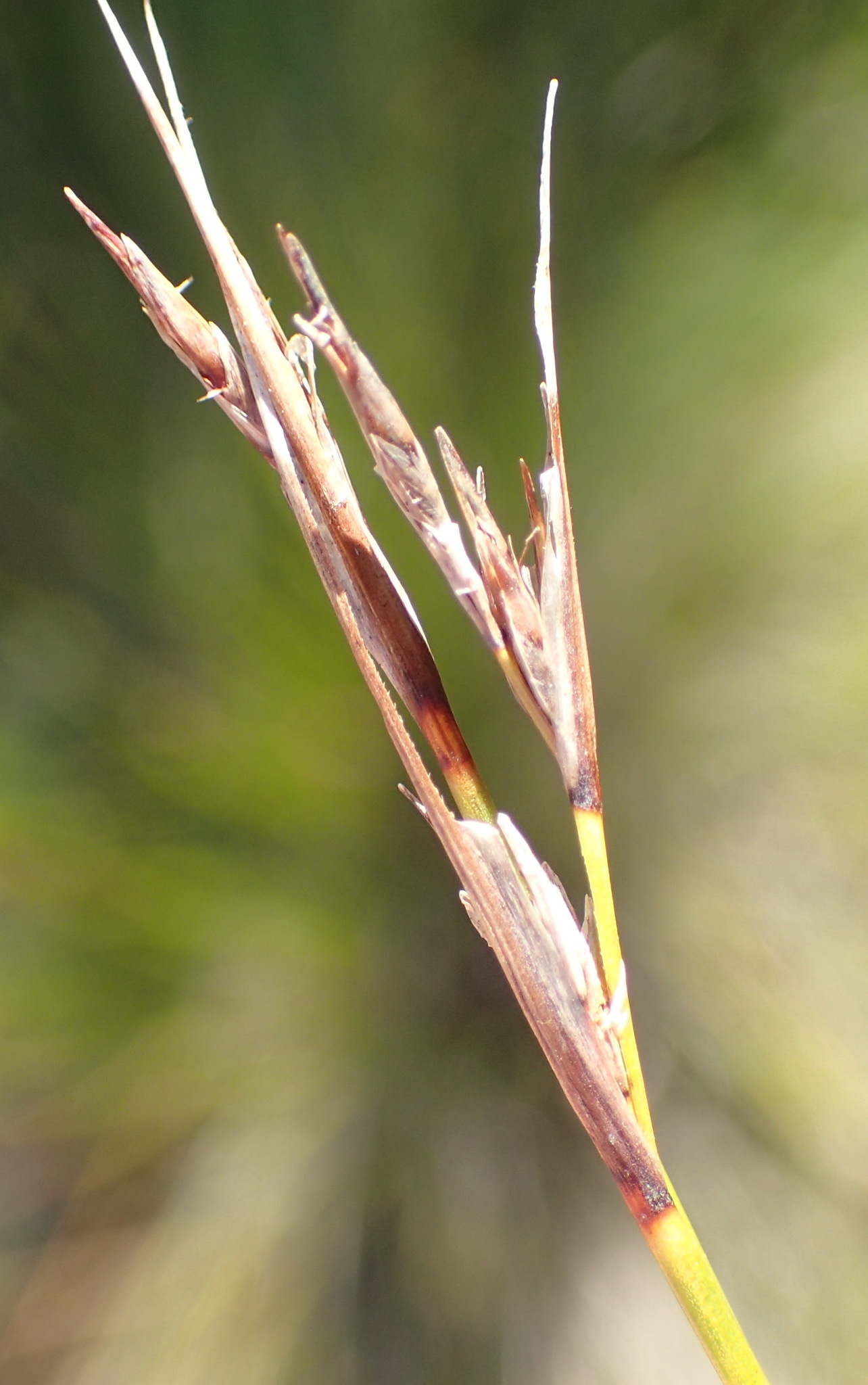
Flowering head

Spikelet

Nutlet (black scale bar is 1mm)

== Taxonomy ==
Schoenus rigidus is a species in family Cyperaceae, tribe Schoeneae, which is a clade that includes genera such as Costularia, Gahnia, Lepidosperma, Oreobolus and Tetraria. Other species in the Epischoenus group of southern African Schoenus are likely to be the most closely related species to S. rigidus based on morphological similarities among species.

Species from the southern African Schoenus were once included in the genus Tetraria; however, both molecular and morphological evidence suggests that the two genera are evolutionary distinct. To ensure that this group of sedges is monophyletic (i.e. the genus only has closely related species), the southern African Tetraria were transferred into Schoenus. The southern African Schoenus can be distinguished from Tetraria species in the field by their lack of stem leaves and the absence of reticulate sheaths at the bases of the flowering stems.

== Distribution and habitat ==
The recorded distribution of Schoenus rigidus ranges from the Grahamstown area in Eastern Cape Province to eastern regions of the Western Cape Province, generally near the southern coast of South Africa. Collections of this species have been made from both moist and dry mountain slopes, flat areas and forests, with the species having an known elevation range between 75 and 1375 metres.

== Images ==
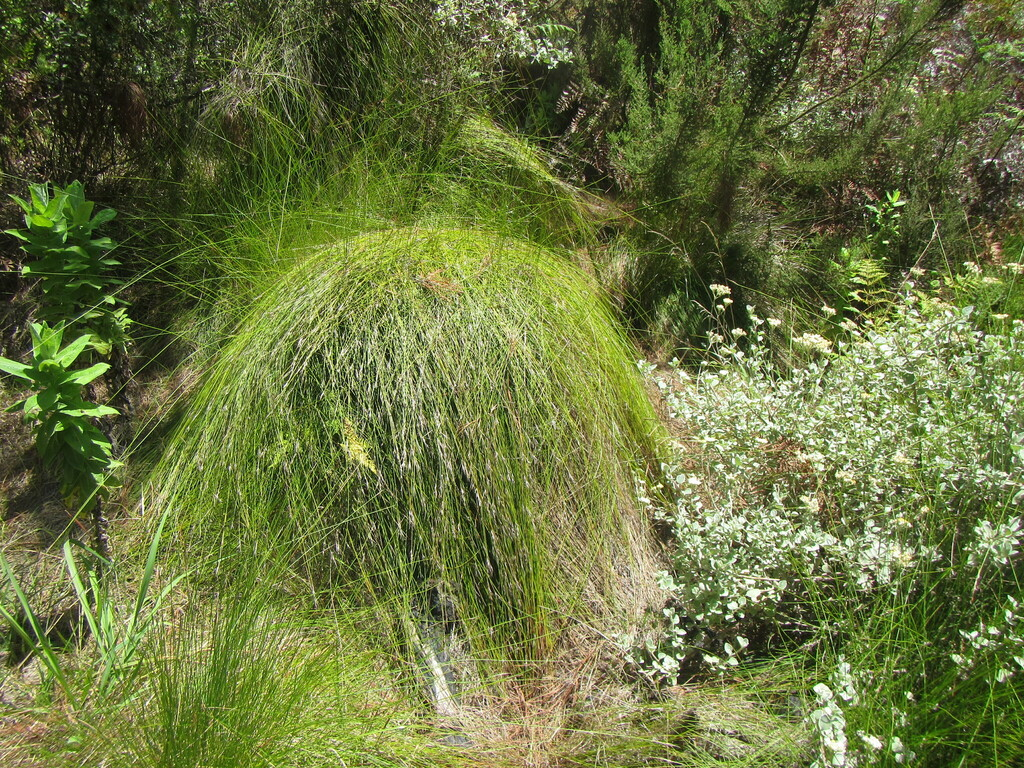
Growth form of S. rigidus

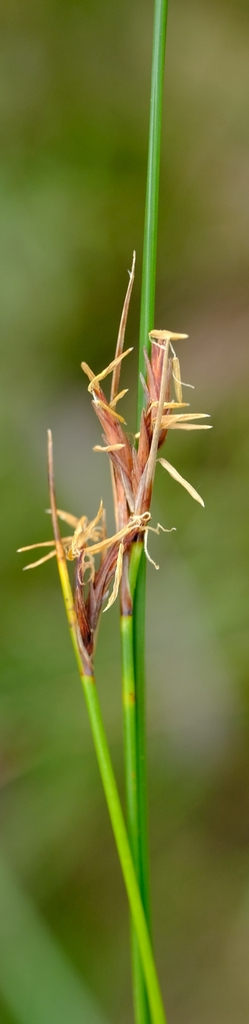
Flowering heads of S. rigidus

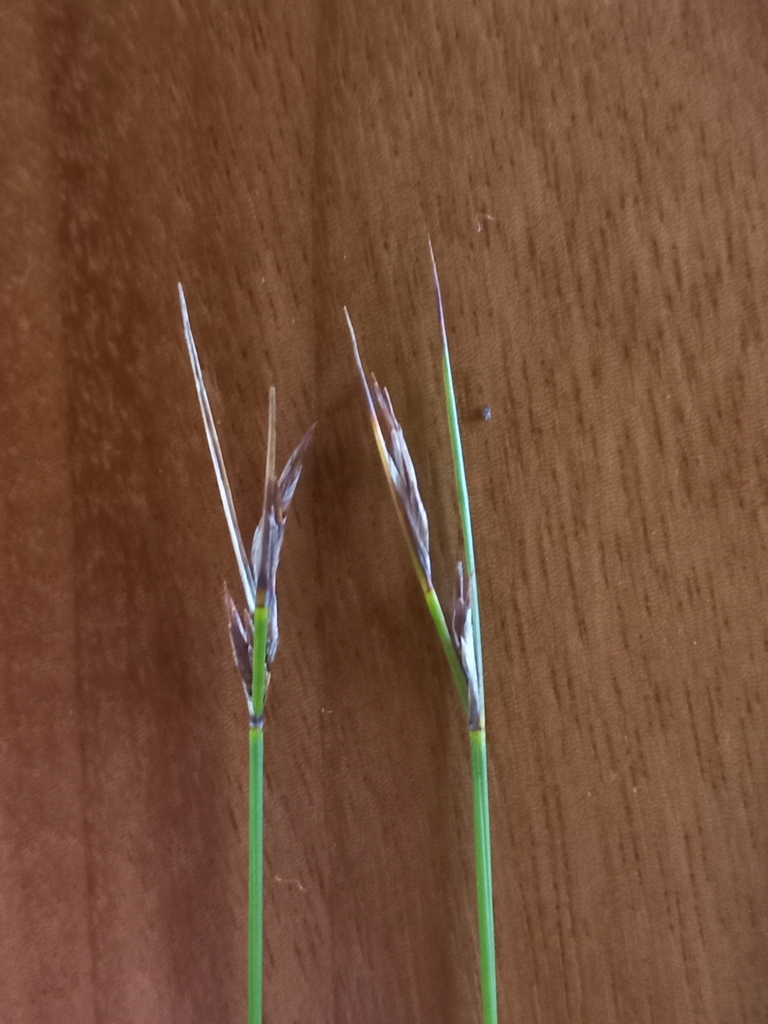
Flowering heads of S. rigidus

Flowering head of S. rigidus

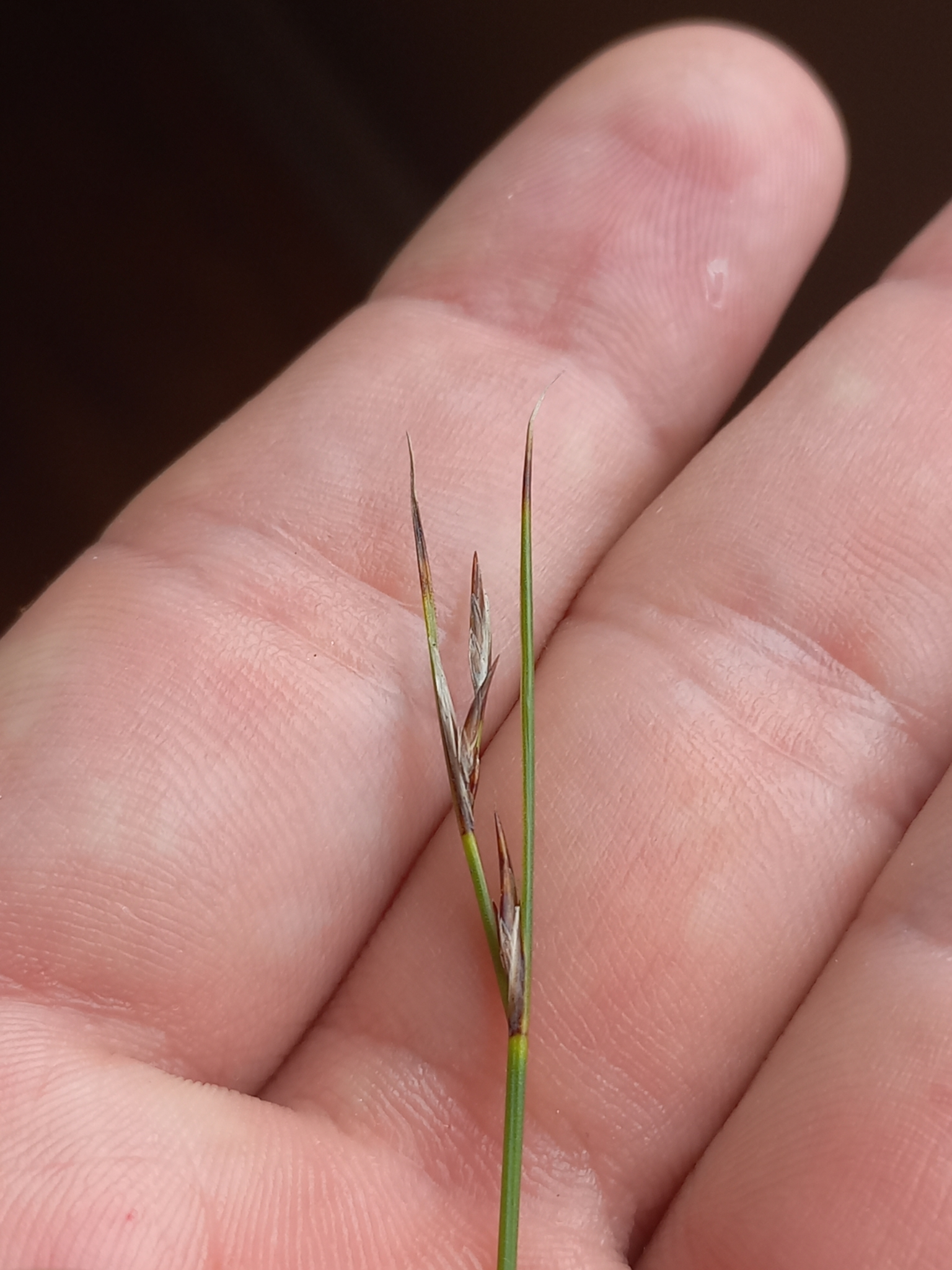
Flowering head of S. rigidus
