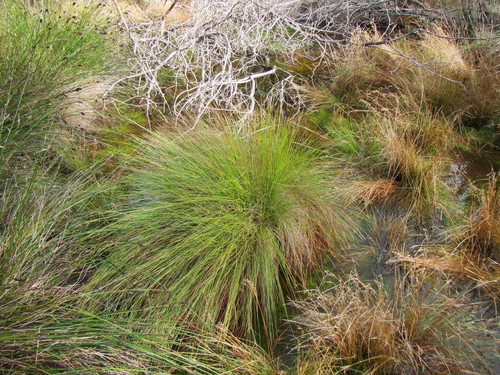
- Slender veldrush

Scientific classification
- Kingdom: Plantae
- Clade: Tracheophytes
- Clade: Angiosperms
- Clade: Monocots
- Clade: Commelinids
- Order: Poales
- Family: Cyperaceae
- Genus: Schoenus
- Species: S. gracillimus

Binomial name
- Schoenus gracillimus T.L.Elliott & Muasya
- Documented collection localities in South Africa

Synonyms
- Epischoenus gracilis Levyns; non Schoenus gracilis Sw.

= Schoenus gracillimus =

Species of grass-like plant

Schoenus gracillimus is a species of sedge endemic to the Western Cape Province of South Africa.

== Description ==
The inflorescence of S. gracillimus has few spikelets (usually less than five), which is similar to Schoenus adnatus, Schoenus crinitus and Schoenus schonlandii. However, the spikelets of S. gracillimus are often pendulous (hanging) on long pedicels, whereas the other three species do not share this character.

Compared to both S. adnatus and S. gracillimus, S. crinitus is a more hairy and rigid species. In addition, S. gracillimus does not have spikelet receptacles that are adnate to the basal glume (bract), as in S. adnatus.

Although there are slight differences in plant and spikelet form, the distributions of S. gracillimus and S. schonlandii differ (S. gracillimus generally grows more to the west).

Difficulties in identifying the southern African Schoenus might be partially explained by their tendency to form hybrids with each other. Preliminary evidence suggests that S. gracillimus might form hybrids with other southern African Schoenus species.

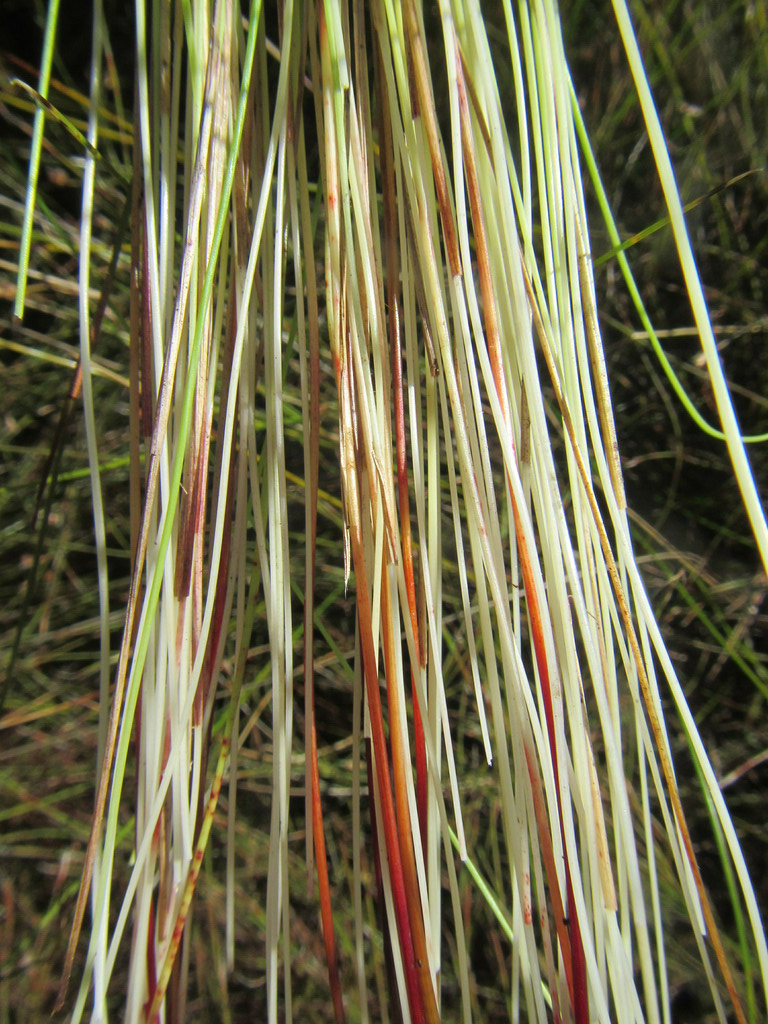
Culm bases

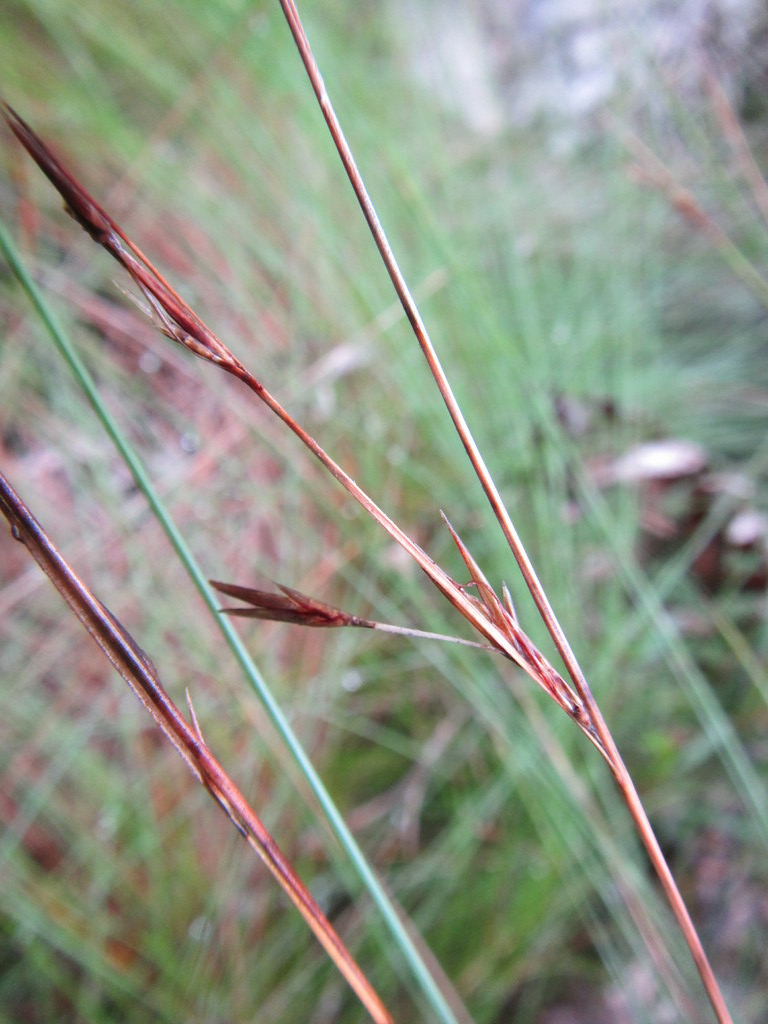
Flowering head (inflorescence)

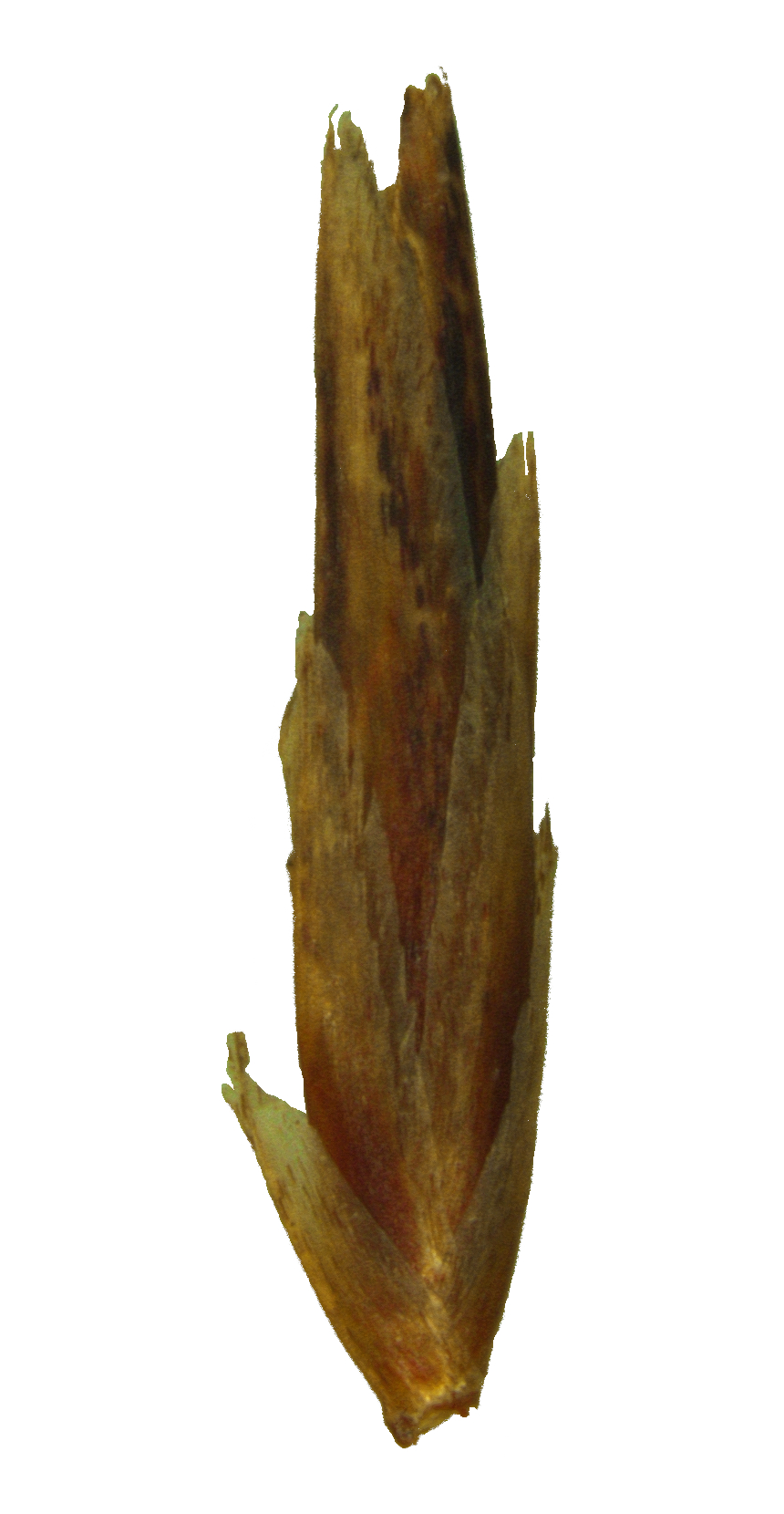
Spikelet

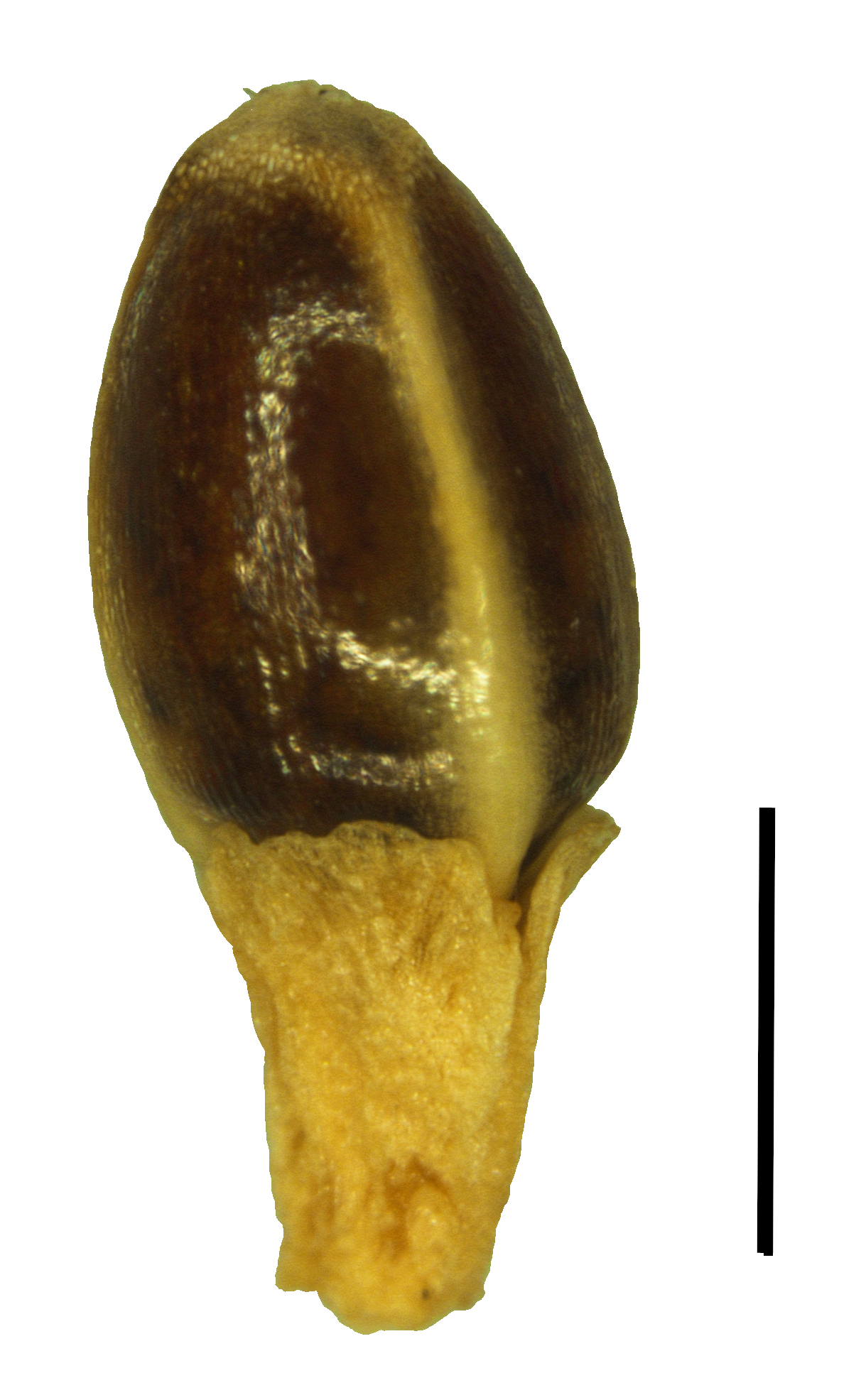
Nutlet (the black scale bar represents 1 mm)

== Taxonomy ==
Schoenus gracillimus is a species in family Cyperaceae, tribe Schoeneae. This tribe includes other notable genera such as Costularia, Gahnia, Lepidosperma, Oreobolus and Tetraria. Phylogenetic and morphological evidence suggests that species in the Epischoenus group are the closest relatives to S. gracillimus.

The genus Tetraria once included species from the southern African Schoenus; however, we now know that the two groups are evolutionary distinct based on morphological and molecular differences. Several species of Epischoenus and the southern African Tetraria were transferred into Schoenus to ensure that the genus is monophyletic (i.e. the genus only has closely related species). In the field, the main distinguishing characters between Tetraria and Schoenus are the lack of stem leaves and absence of reticulate sheaths at the bases of the flowering stems in the latter genus.

== Distribution and habitat ==
Most collections of Schoenus gracillimus have been from damp sites in the mountains of Western Cape Province. However, some collections have been made from elevations near sea level.

== Gallery ==
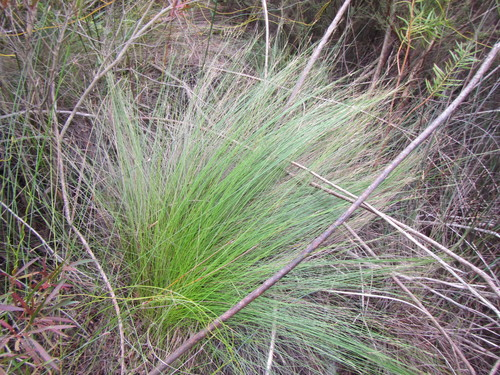
Growth form

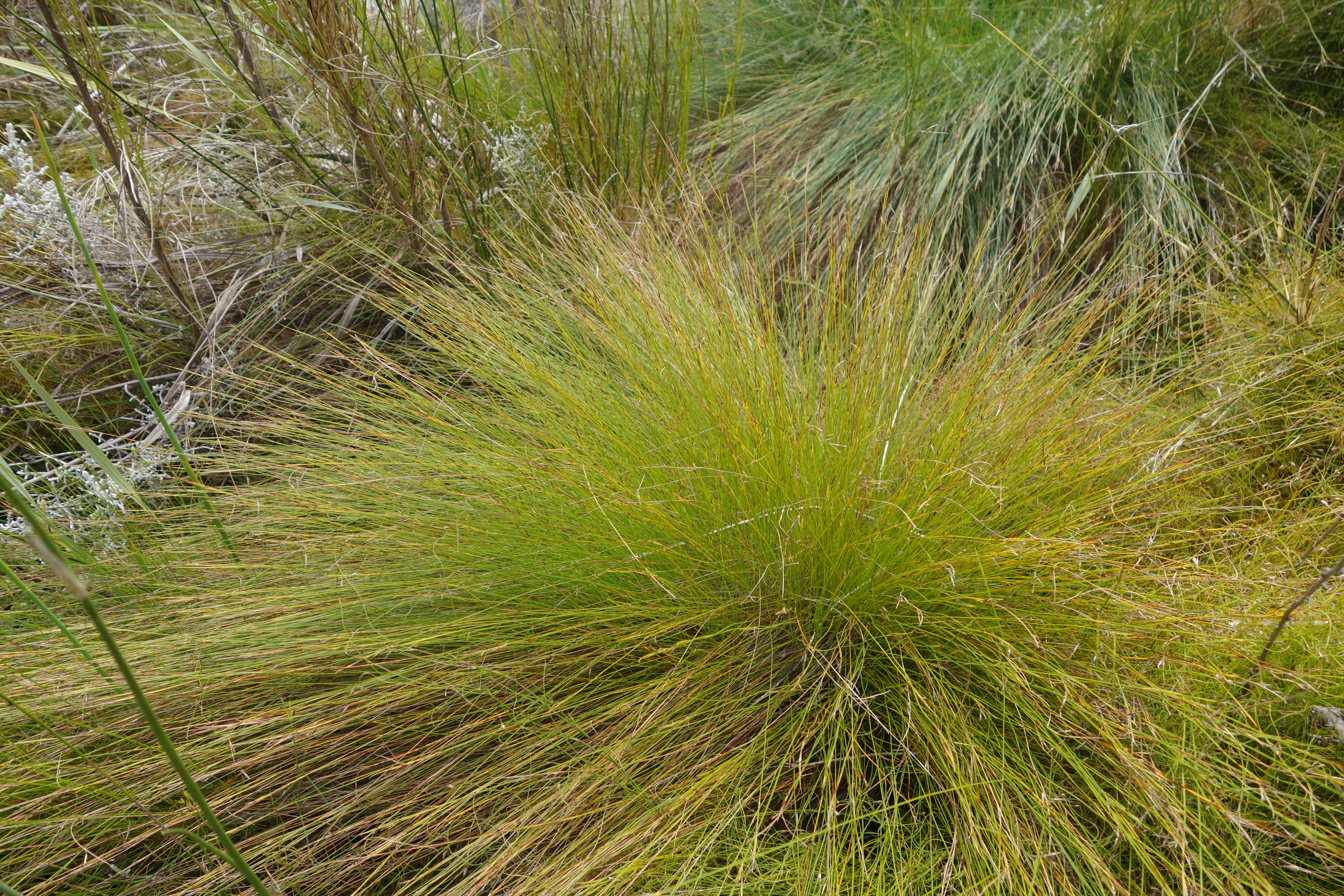
Growth form

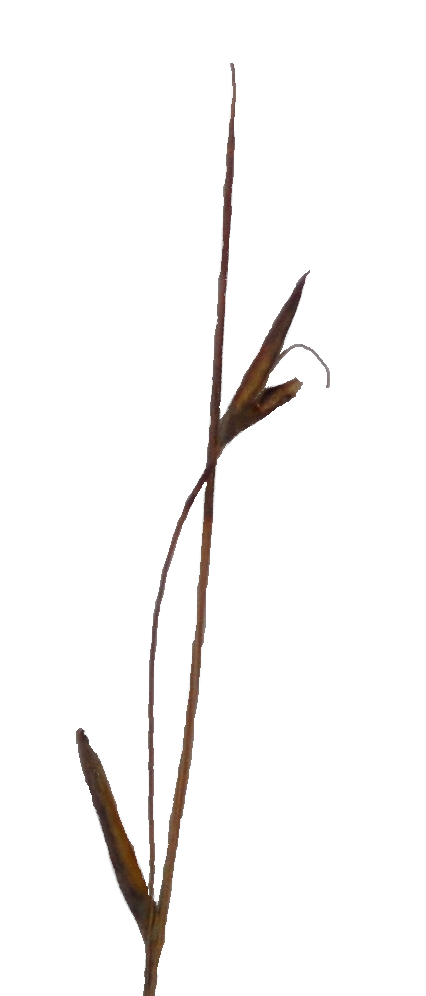
Flowering head

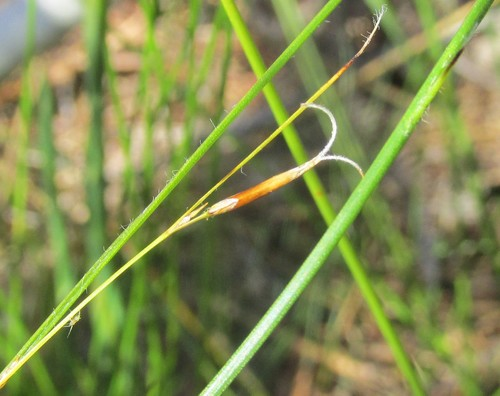
Flowering head

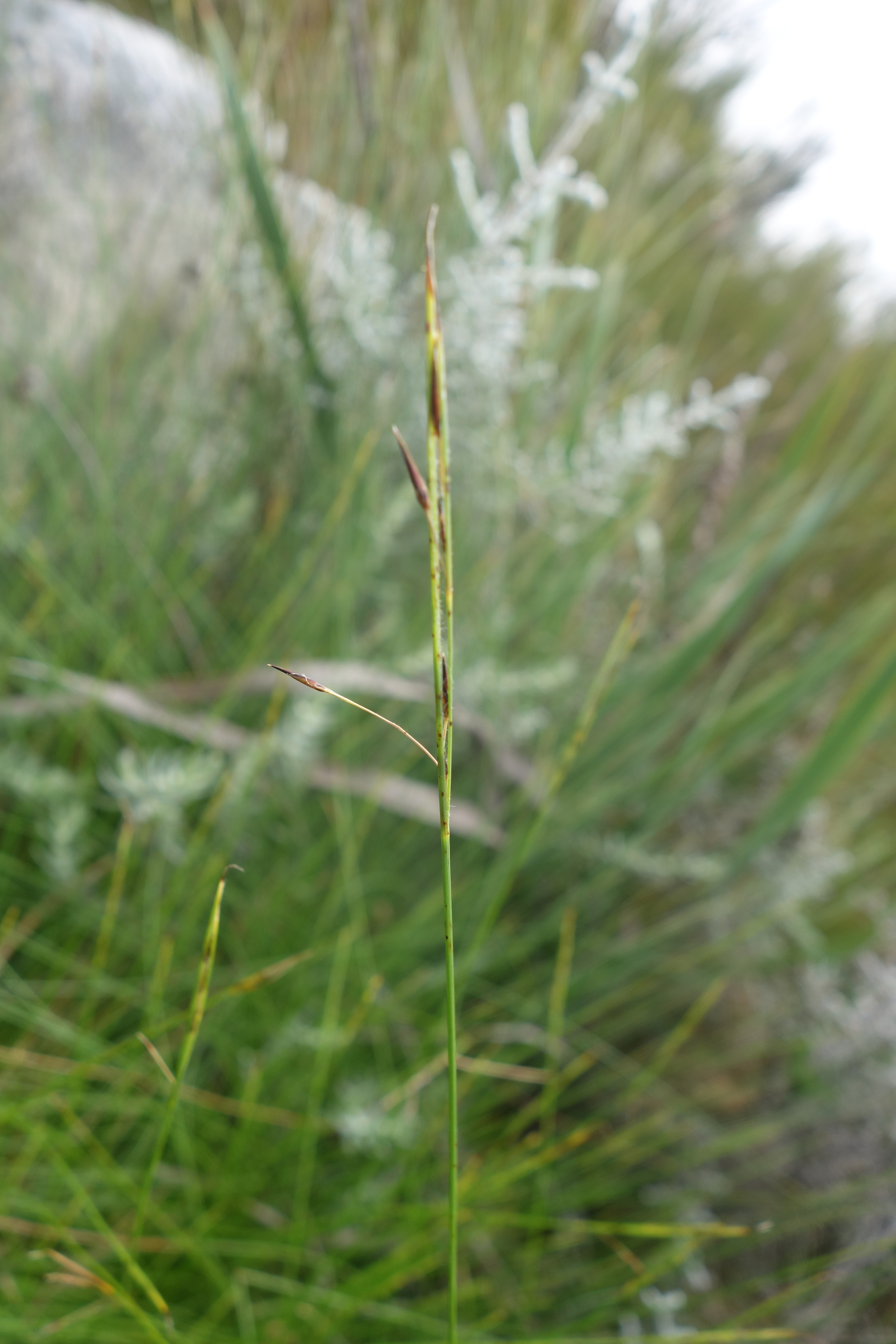
Flowering head
