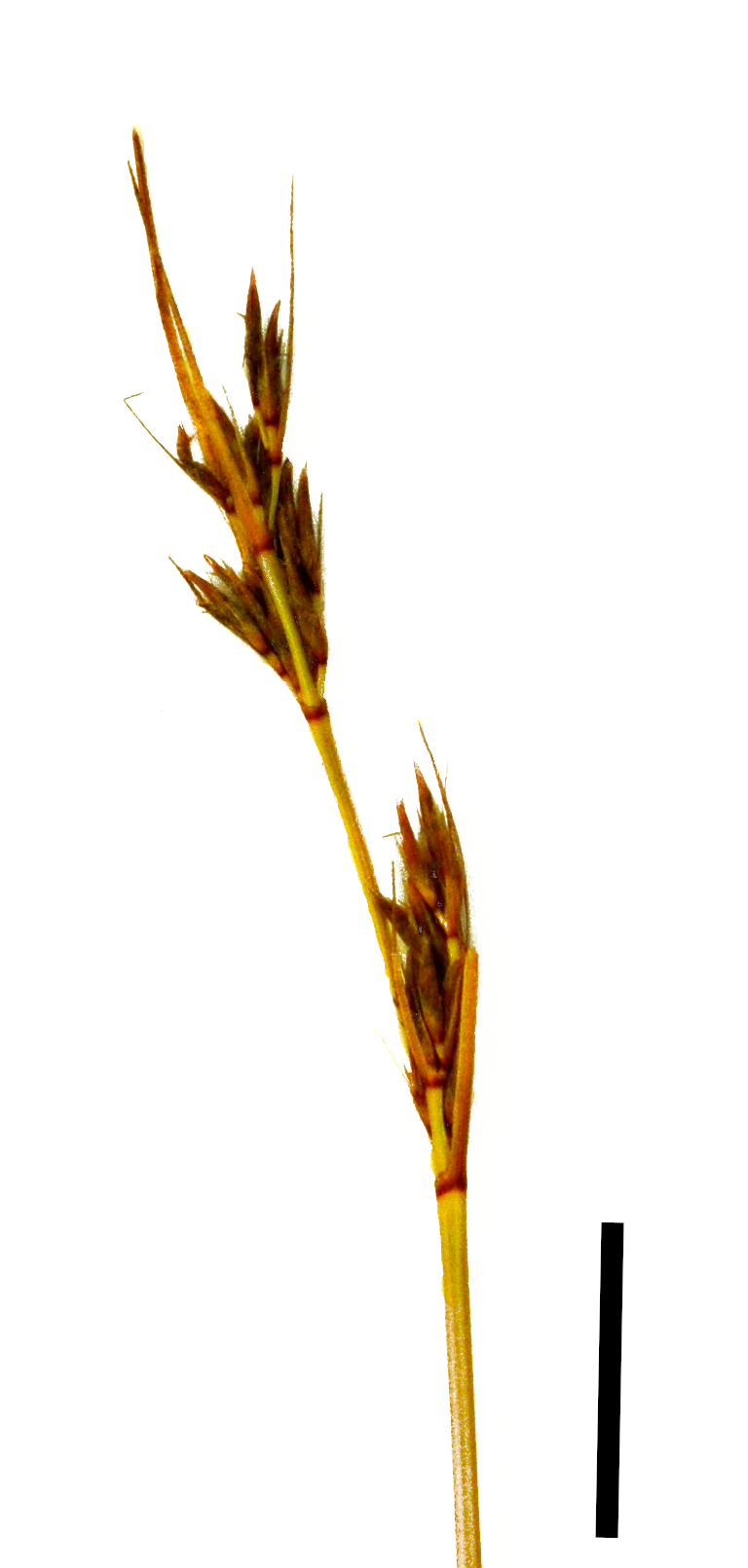
- Brown veldrush

Scientific classification
- Kingdom: Plantae
- Clade: Tracheophytes
- Clade: Angiosperms
- Clade: Monocots
- Clade: Commelinids
- Order: Poales
- Family: Cyperaceae
- Genus: Schoenus
- Species: S. brunnescens

Binomial name
- Schoenus brunnescens T.L.Elliott & Muasya
- Documented collection localities in South Africa

= Schoenus brunnescens =

Species of grass-like plant

Schoenus brunnescens is a species of sedge endemic to the Western Cape Province of South Africa.

== Description ==
One of the more distinctive morphological characters of Schoenus brunnescens is the brown culm bases of this species, compared to the more reddish ones of the majority of southern African Schoenus. A second species of southern African Schoenus that has brown culm bases is Schoenus bracteosus; however, that species has firm primary inflorescence bracts that enclose its spikes — a character absent from S. brunnescens.

Similar to Schoenus compactus and Schoenus crassus, S. brunnescens has straight and stiff basal culm leaves (i.e. leaves at the base of its flowering stems). However, the culm bases of S. compactus and S. crassus are generally more reddish-brown compared to the ones of S. brunnescens. In addition, the spikelets of S. compactus and S. crassus are generally longer and the nutlets larger compared to those of S. brunnescens.

The inflorescence of S. brunnescens is generally more elongate and thinner compared to the more congested (i.e. compact) panicle of S. compactus.

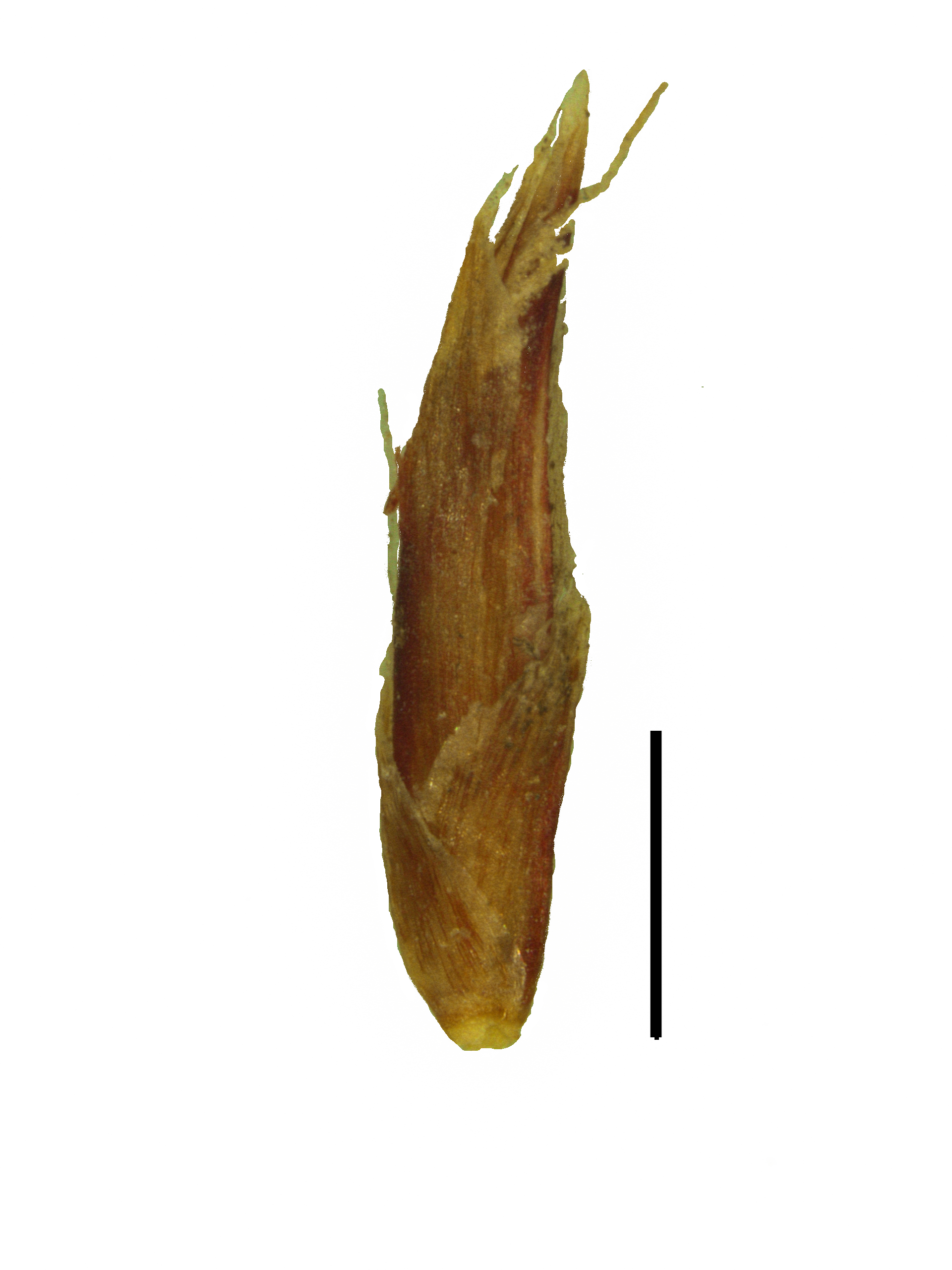
Spikelet (the black scale bar represents 1 mm)

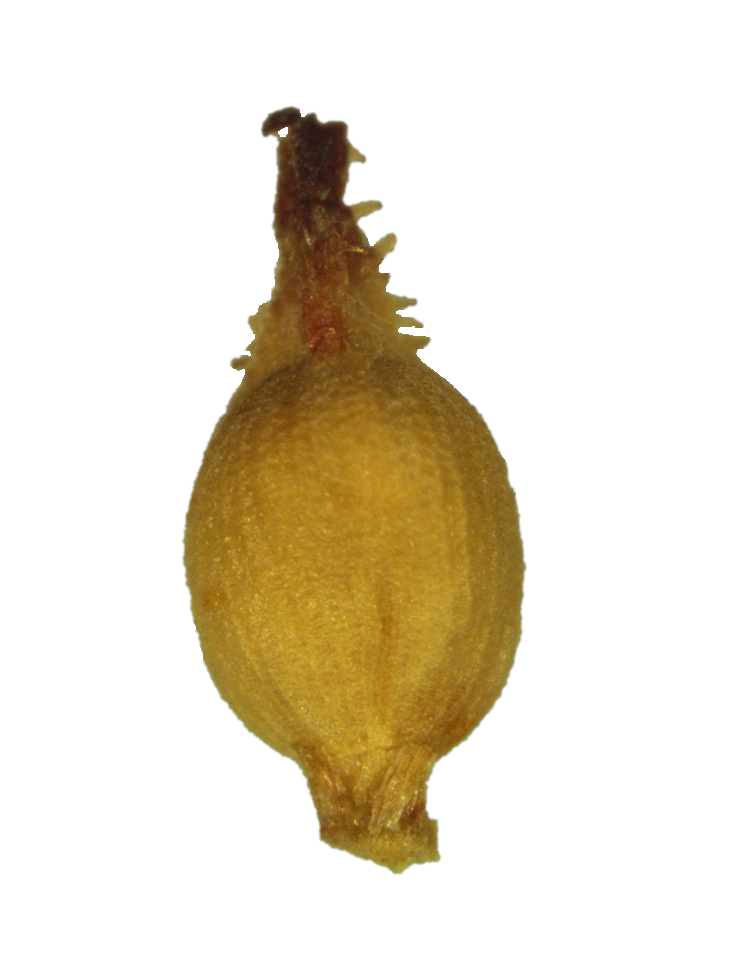
Nutlet

== Taxonomy ==
Schoenus brunnescens is a species in family Cyperaceae, tribe Schoeneae, which also includes the genera Costularia, Lepidosperma, Oreobolus, Tetraria and Gahnia. Based on preliminary phylogenetic evidence, Schoenus brunnescens is closely related to other southern African Schoenus species in the S. cuspidatus and allies group, specifically, S. compactus and S. crassus.

The southern African Schoenus were once classified as Tetraria; however, we now know that the two groups are evolutionary distinct based on molecular and morphological differences. To ensure that this group of sedges is monophyletic (i.e. the genus only has closely related species), several species of Epischoenus and the southern African Tetraria were transferred into Schoenus. Plants classified as Schoenus can be distinguished from Tetraria in the field by the absence of reticulate sheaths at the bases of the flowering stems and the lack of stem leaves in Schoenus.

== Distribution and habitat ==
The known distribution of S. brunnescens is from the Rooi Els and Worcester areas in the west to the Langeberg Mountains to the east of the Western Cape Province.

The reported elevation range of S. brunnescens is from 70-610 m, and this species usually grows on coarse-textured soils in the fynbos vegetation type.
