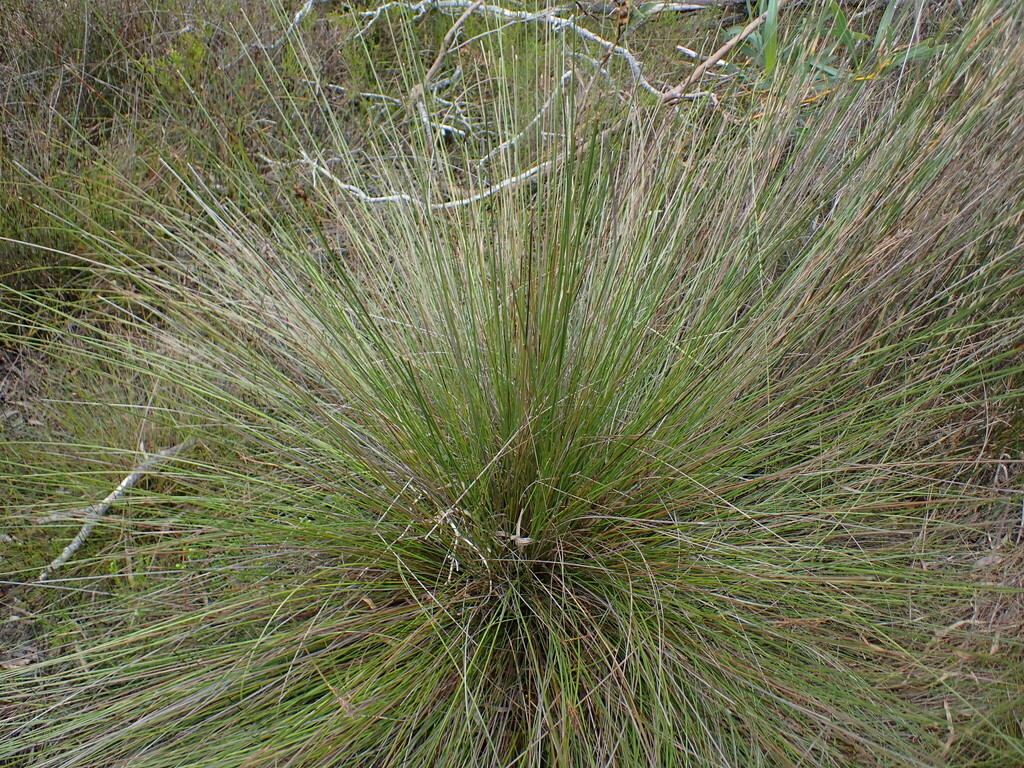
- Southern veldrush

Scientific classification
- Kingdom: Plantae
- Clade: Tracheophytes
- Clade: Angiosperms
- Clade: Monocots
- Clade: Commelinids
- Order: Poales
- Family: Cyperaceae
- Genus: Schoenus
- Species: S. australis

Binomial name
- Schoenus australis T.L.Elliott & Muasya
- Documented collection localities in South Africa

= Schoenus australis =

Species of grass-like plant

Schoenus australis is a species of sedge endemic to locations near the southern coast of South Africa.

== Description ==
Schoenus australis is one of the more robust species of southern African Schoenus. The inflorescences of this species are relatively long and wide, often appearing 'bearded' because of the notable primary inflorescence bracts, as well as long prophyll and glume (bract) pointed tips (mucros).

A similar species to S. australis is Schoenus loreus, which also has relatively long and dense inflorescences, but its leaves are non-channelled (appearing flat) compared to the roundish leaves of S. australis.

A second species that is similar to S. australis is Schoenus riparius: however, that species is taller and endemic to wet areas on the Cape Peninsula of South Africa. In addition, the inflorescences of S. australis are almost always shorter and narrower than those of S. riparius.

Schoenus crassus and Schoenus cuspidatus could also be mistaken for S. australis, with the distribution of all three species overlapping. Schoenus crassus tends to have shorter (i.e. less than half the culm height) and firmer leaves compared to those of S. australis. Furthermore, the lower glumes of the spikelets of S. australis are relatively longer and aristate compared to the shorter, cuspidate lower spikelet glumes of S. cuspidatus.

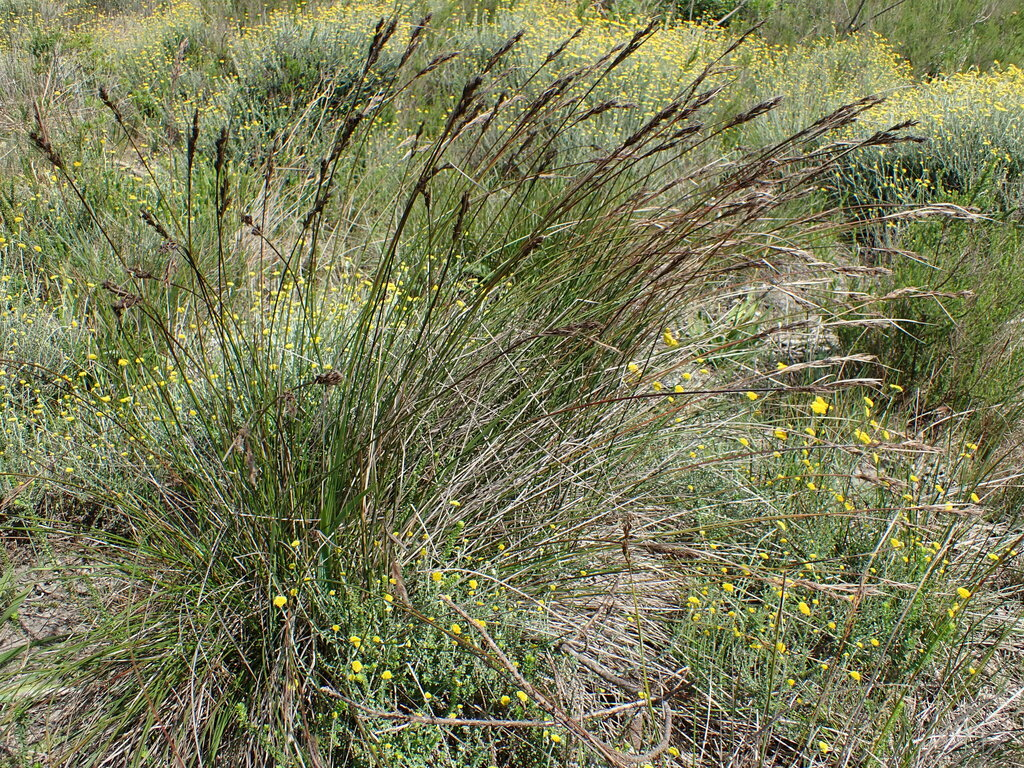
Growth form

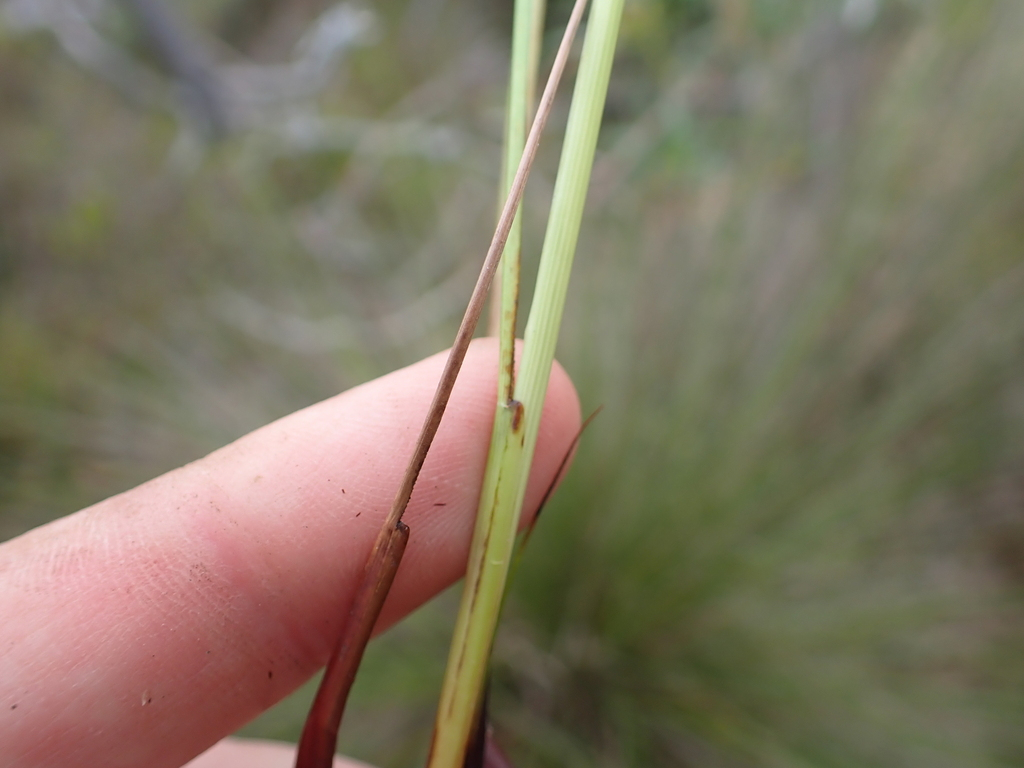
Ligule

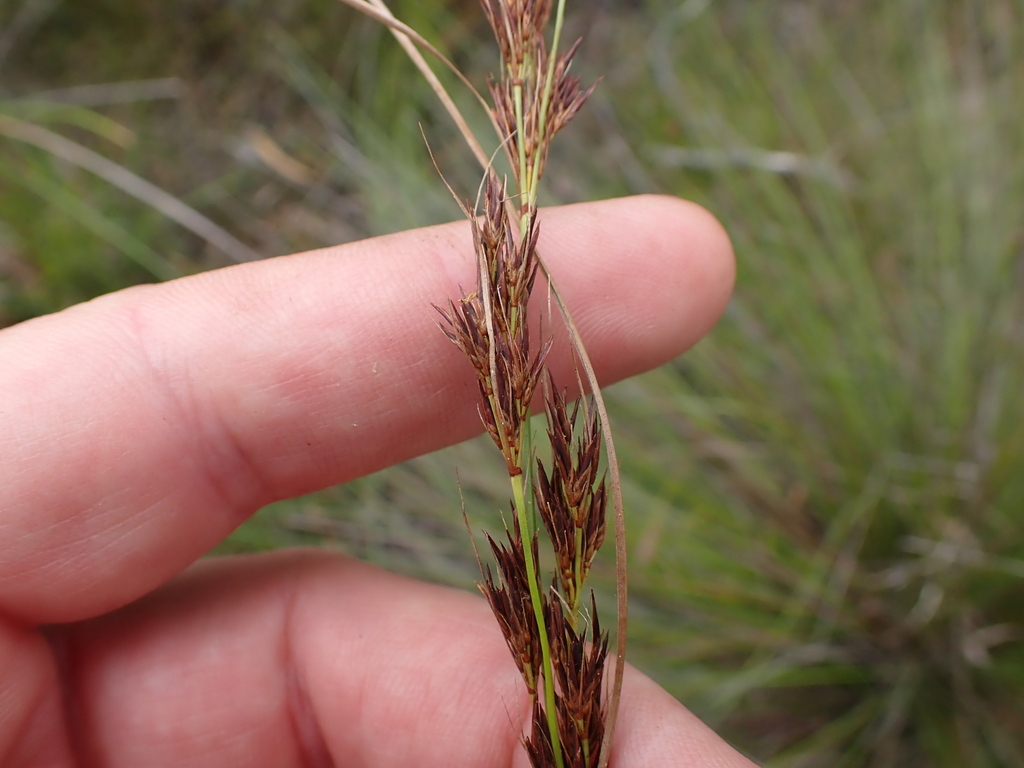
Flowering head

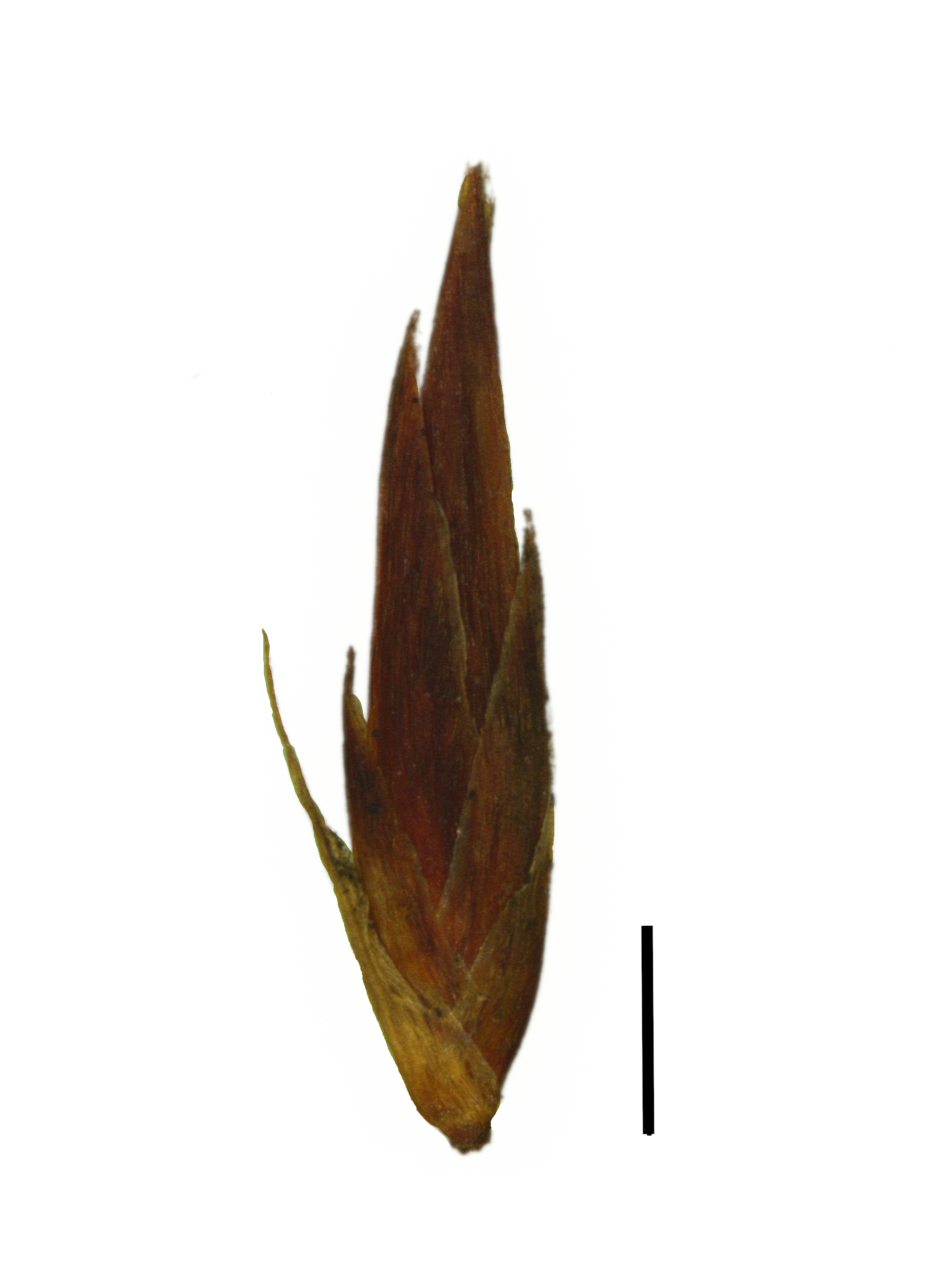
Spikelet (the black scale bar represents 1 mm)

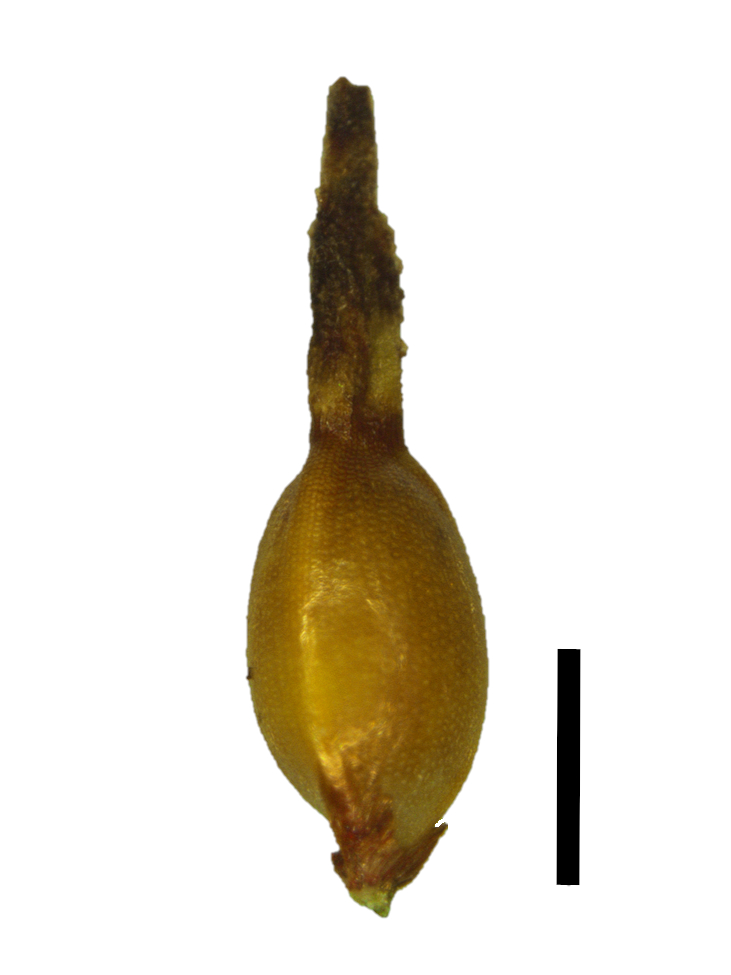
Nutlet (the black scale bar represents 1 mm)

== Taxonomy ==
Schoenus australis is a species in family Cyperaceae, tribe Schoeneae, which includes genera such as Lepidosperma, Oreobolus, Costularia, Tetraria and Gahnia. Schoenus australis is closely related to other southern African Schoenus species, specifically, species in the S. cuspidatus and allies group.

Southern African Schoenus were once classified as Tetraria; however, we now know that the two groups are evolutionary distinct based on molecular and morphological differences. To ensure that this group of sedges is monophyletic (i.e. the genus only has closely related species), several species of Epischoenus and the southern African Tetraria were transferred into Schoenus. In the field, the southern African Schoenus can be distinguished from Tetraria species by the absence of reticulate sheaths at the bases of the flowering stems and their lack of stem leaves.

== Distribution and habitat ==
Schoenus australis is endemic to locations along the southern coast of South Africa, with its distribution ranging from Rooi Els in the Western Cape Province to the Port Elizabeth area of the Eastern Cape Province.

This species has mostly been recorded from locations with sand substrates (e.g. dunes), but collections have also been made from seepage areas, road edges, floodplains, sandstone fynbos and limestone fynbos. The elevation range of S. australis has mostly been relatively low, ranging from sea level to 600 m.

== Gallery ==
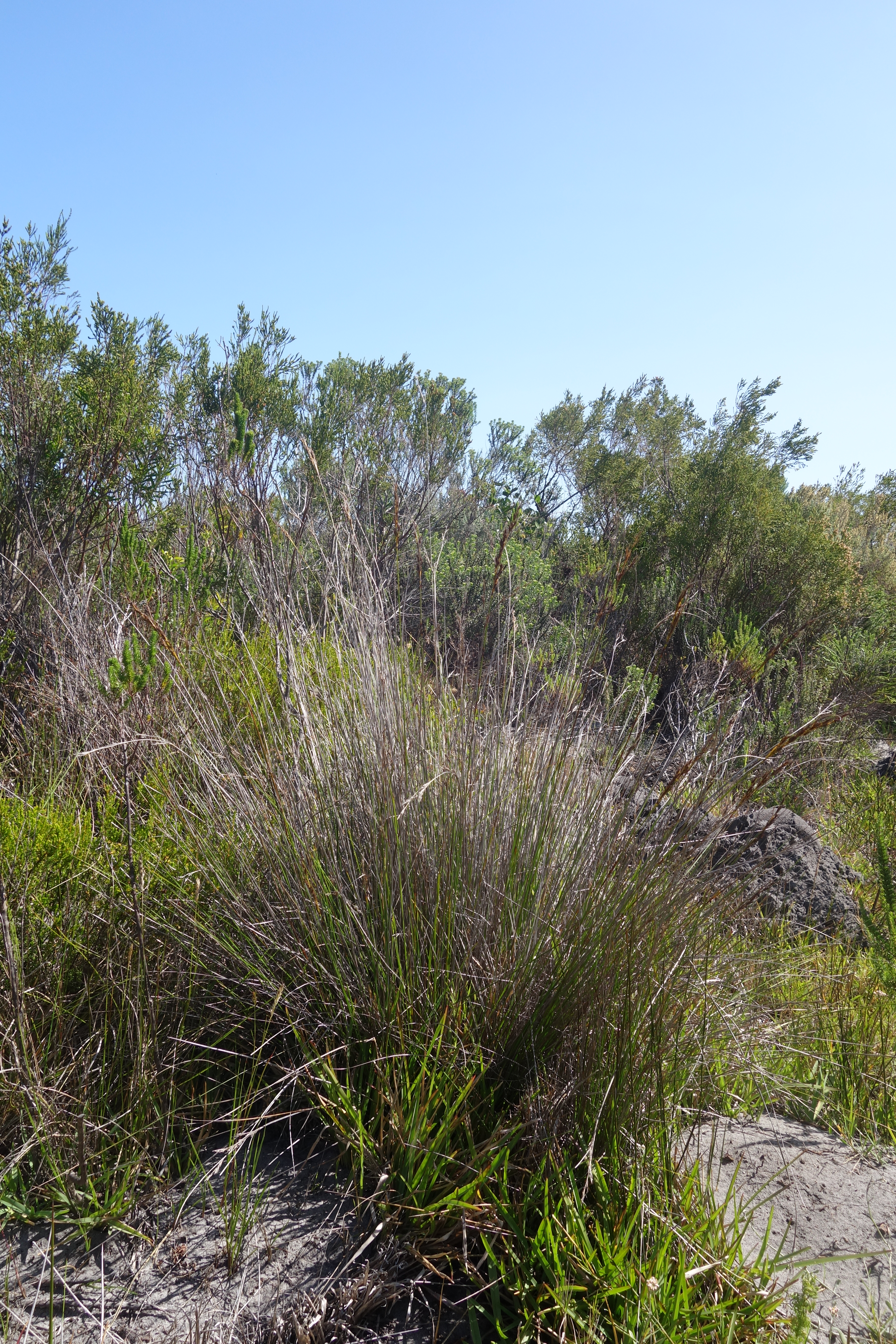
Growth form

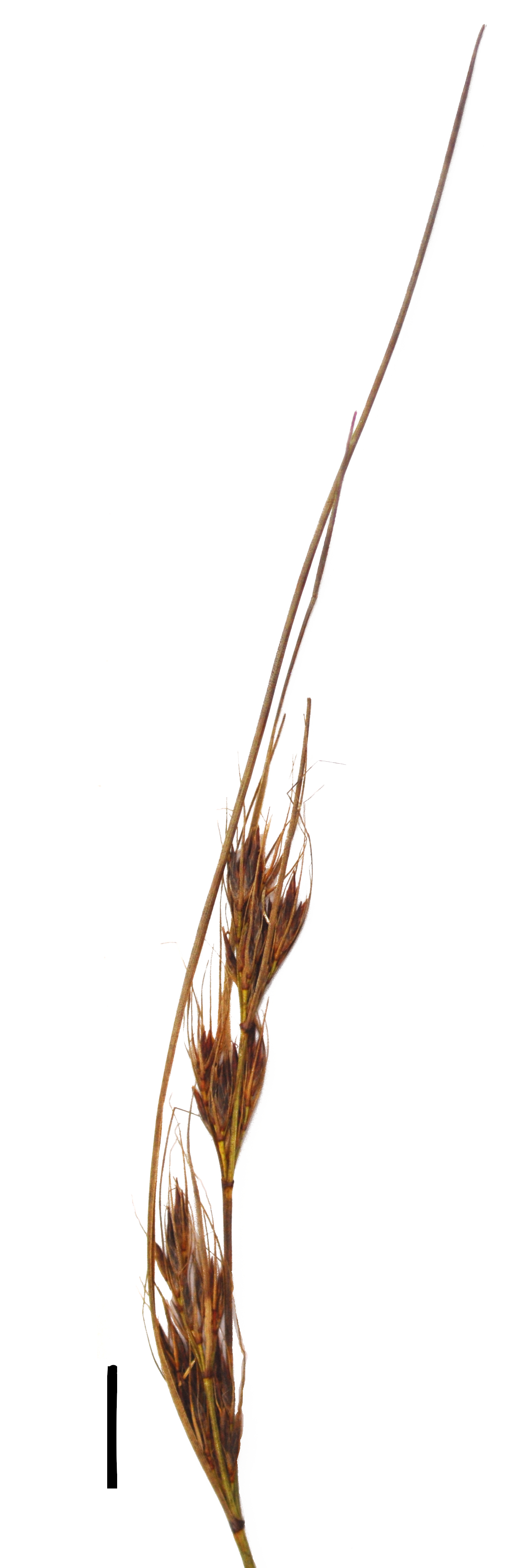
Flowering head

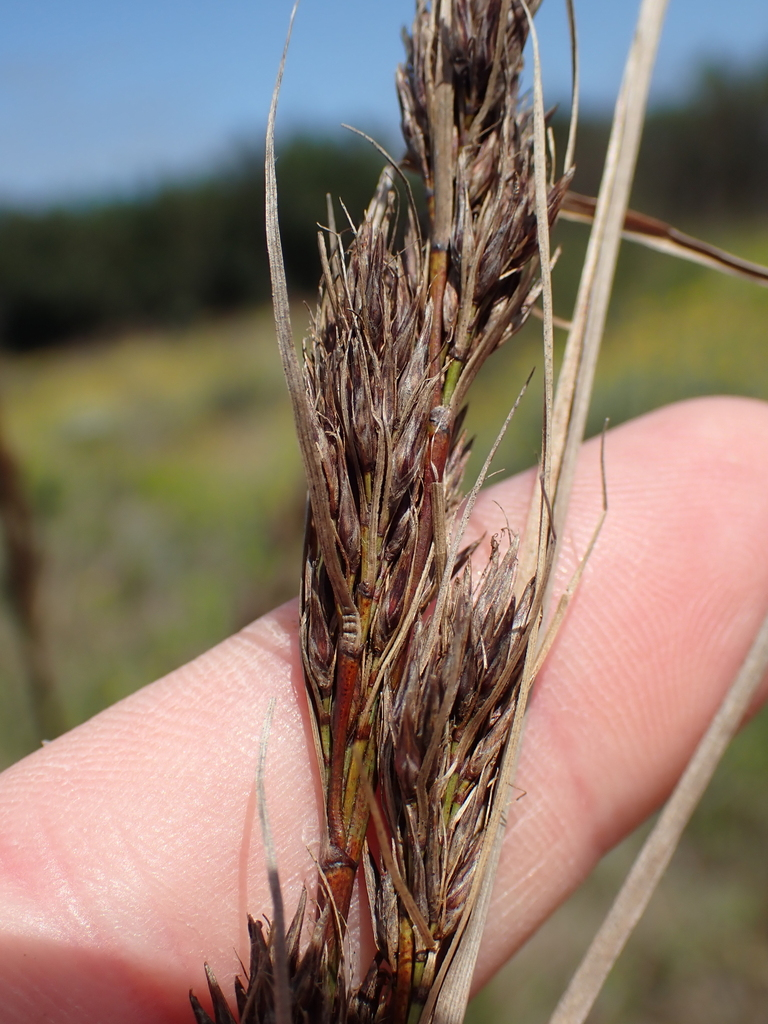
Flowering head

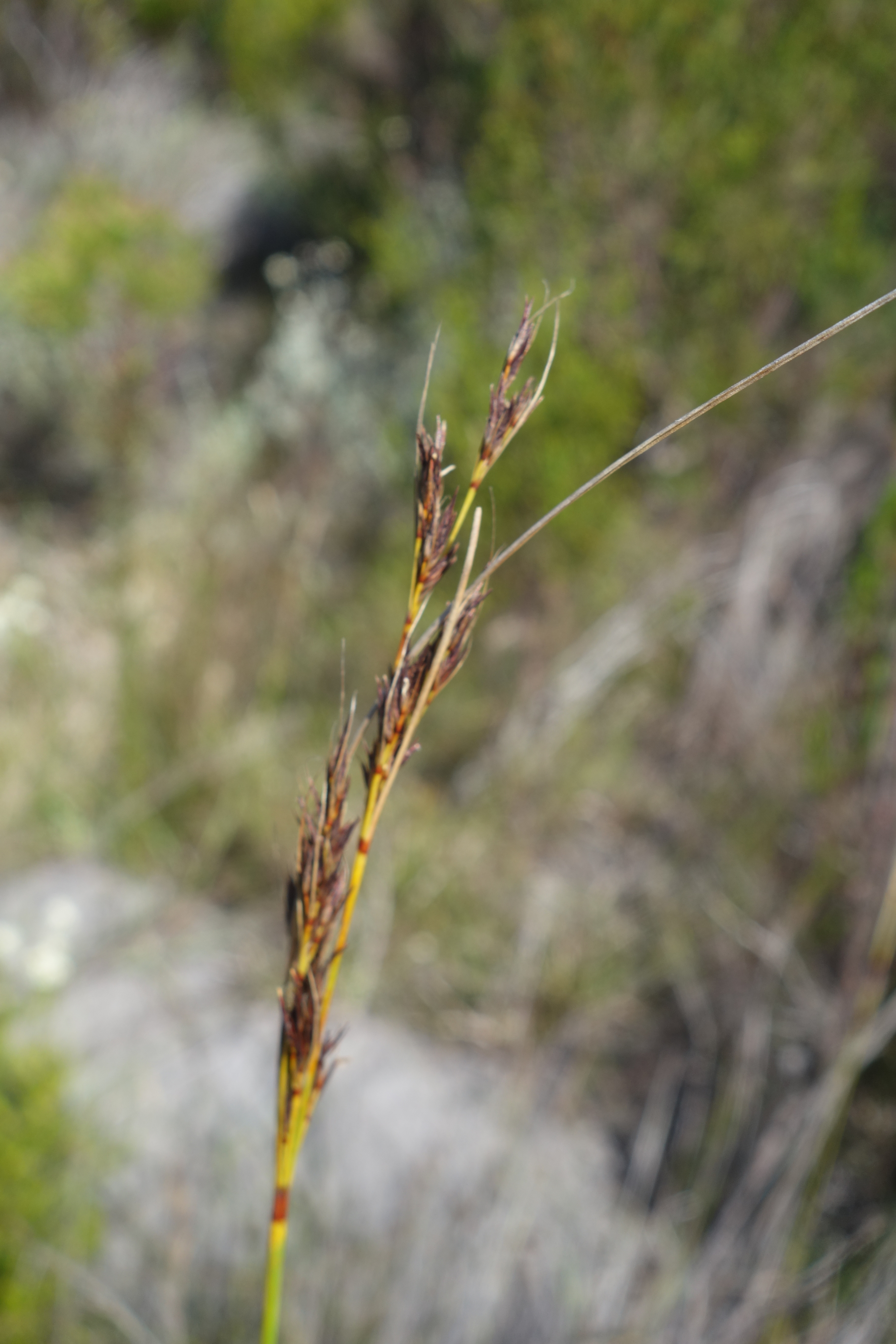
Flowering head

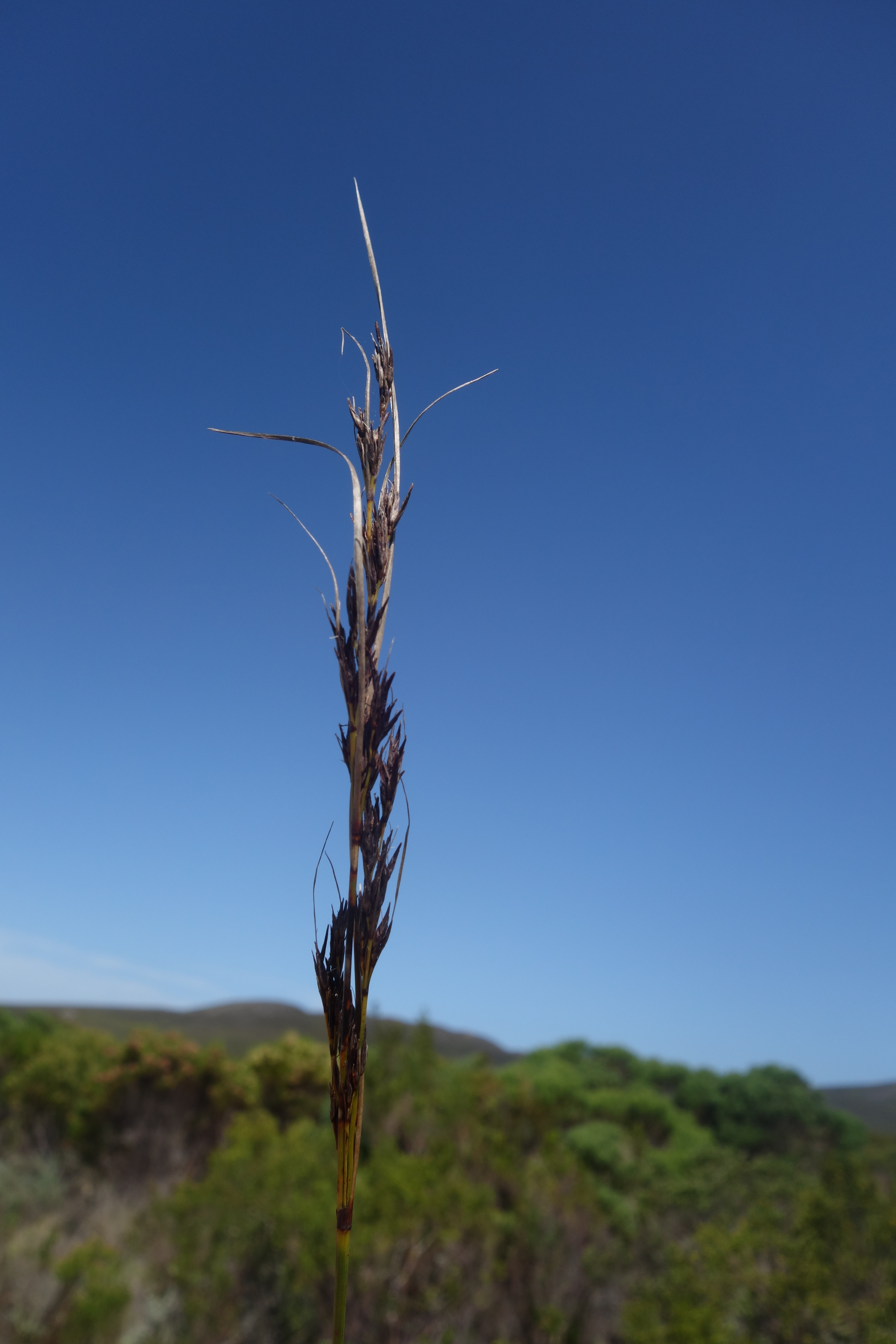
Flowering head
