= Schoenus riparius =

- River Veldrush

Scientific classification
- Kingdom: Plantae
- Clade: Tracheophytes
- Clade: Angiosperms
- Clade: Monocots
- Clade: Commelinids
- Order: Poales
- Family: Cyperaceae
- Genus: Schoenus
- Species: S. riparius

Binomial name
- Schoenus riparius T.L.Elliott & Muasya
- Documented collection localities in South Africa

Synonyms
- Tetraria paludosa Levyns; Tetraria cuspidata (Rottb.) C.B.Clarke f. robustior Kük.

Species of grass-like plant

Schoenus riparius is a species of sedge endemic to the Cape Peninsula of South Africa.

== Description ==
Schoenus riparius is a robust species having relatively long and wide panicles compared to other closely related species. This species has aristate spikelets.

One of the species that most closely resembles S. riparius is Schoenus loreus, but that species has flat non-channelled leaves compared to the channelled leaves that become terete above as in S. riparius.

A second species that resembles S. riparius is Schoenus australis, which is also a relatively large and robust species. Site preferences differ between these two species, however, as S. riparius occurs on damp sites on the Cape Peninsula, whereas S. australis is found on coarse-textured soils (e.g. sandy sites). In addition, the inflorescence of S. australis is shorter and thinner compared to that of S. riparius.

Schoenus crassus also resembles S. riparius, but the former species usually has firmer and stiffer basal leaves compared to the more lax leaves of S. riparius. Furthermore, S. riparius has darker reddish-brown culm bases, inflorescences and spikelets compared to S. crassus.

Similar to other sedges, plants in this group are very difficult to identify. It appears that part of this problem is caused by the tendency of the southern African Schoenus to form hybrids with each other. Due to a lack of evidence, it is unclear whether S. riparius forms hybrids with other southern African Schoenus species.

Spikelet

Nutlet (the black scale bar represents 1 mm)

== Taxonomy ==
Schoenus riparius is a species in family Cyperaceae, tribe Schoeneae. Other notable genera in tribe Schoeneae include Lepidosperma, Oreobolus, Costularia, Tetraria and Gahnia. The most closely related species to S. riparius are other southern African Schoenus species, specifically, species in the S. cuspidatus and allies group.

Southern African Schoenus were once classified as Tetraria; however, based on molecular and morphological differences, we now know that the two groups are evolutionary distinct. To ensure that this group of sedges is monophyletic (i.e. the genus only has closely related species), several species of Epischoenus and the southern African Tetraria were transferred into Schoenus. In the field, the southern African Schoenus can be distinguished from Tetraria species by their lack of stem leaves and the absence of reticulate sheaths at the bases of the flowering stems.

== Distribution and habitat ==
Schoenus riparius has been found growing in wet sites on the Cape Peninsula of South Africa.
