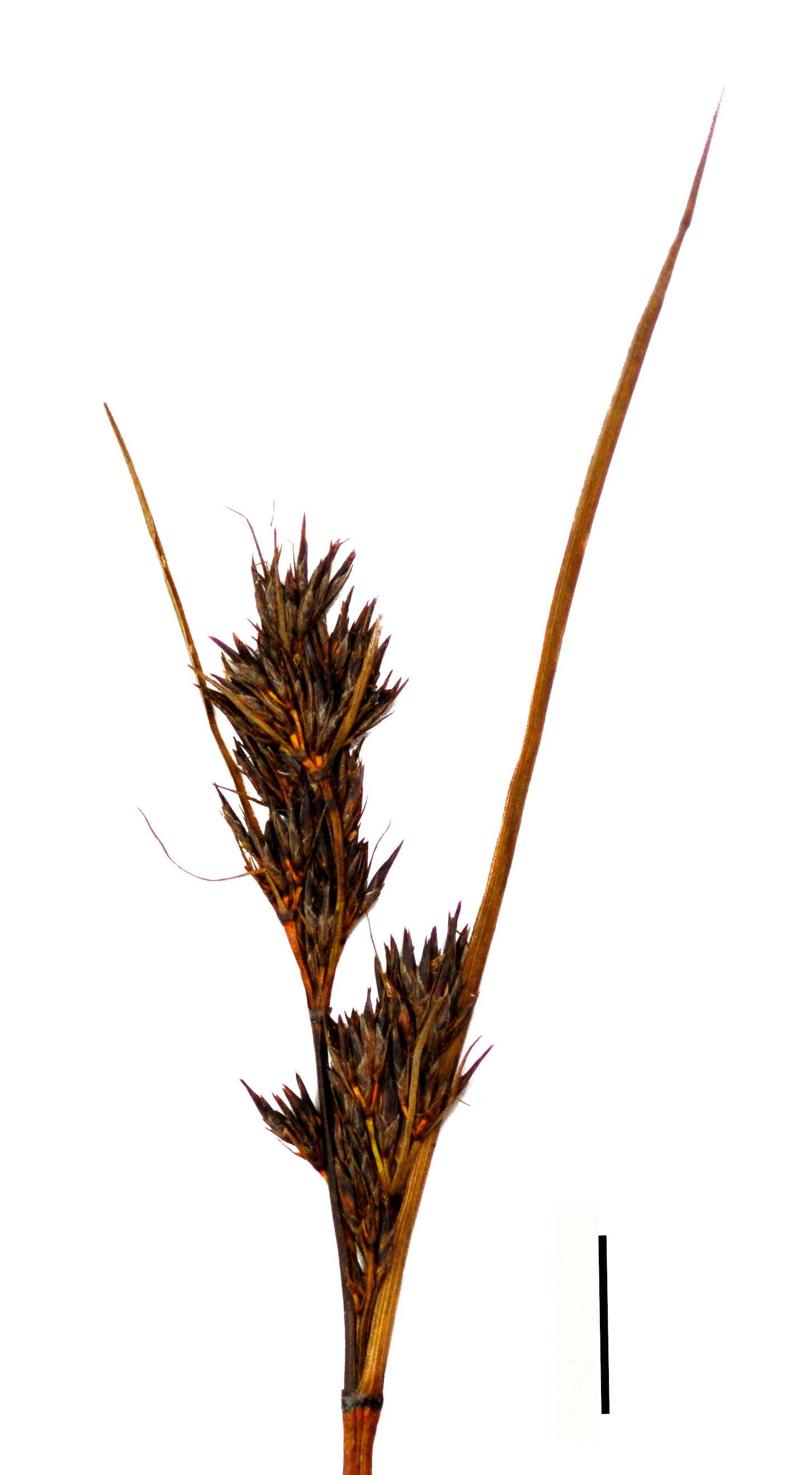
- Flatleaf veldrush

Scientific classification
- Kingdom: Plantae
- Clade: Tracheophytes
- Clade: Angiosperms
- Clade: Monocots
- Clade: Commelinids
- Order: Poales
- Family: Cyperaceae
- Genus: Schoenus
- Species: S. loreus

Binomial name
- Schoenus loreus (Nees) Kuntze
- Documented collection localities in South Africa

Synonyms
- Elynanthus loreus Nees, pro parte; Tetraria cuspidata (Rottb.) C.B.Clarke var. lorea (Nees) C.B.Clarke

= Schoenus loreus =

Species of grass-like plant

Schoenus loreus is a species of sedge endemic to locations near the southern coast of South Africa.

== Description ==
Schoenus loreus is one of the largest species of southern African Schoenus. This is a robust species, with plants usually having non-channelled, open and flat leaves.

Two other robust and stout species of southern African Schoenus are Schoenus australis and Schoenus riparius; however, both of these species have leaves that are channelled and terete above. Species distributions and habitat preferences differentiate the three species, as S. riparius is restricted to wet areas of the Cape Peninsula, whereas S. loreus is primarily a species of the Eastern Cape and adjacent areas of the Western Cape Province of South Africa. Schoenus loreus has wider habitat preferences (e.g. thornveld and grasslands) compared to S. australis, which usually grows on coarse-textured soils along the southern coast of South Africa.

The spikelets of Schoenus loreus and Schoenus cuspidatus are similar in size and shape, but the size of the inflorescences (flowering heads) and differences in growth forms differentiate the two species. Specifically, S. loreus is a taller, more robust plant and has longer inflorescences with more spikes compared to S. cuspidatus. Furthermore, S. cuspidatus does not have the non-channelled, open and flat leaves that are characteristic of S. loreus.

Southern African Schoenus species are difficult to identify, which might be partially explained by the tendency of species in this group to form hybrids with each other. Based on preliminary evidence, it is not clear whether Schoenus loreus forms hybrids with other southern African Schoenus species.

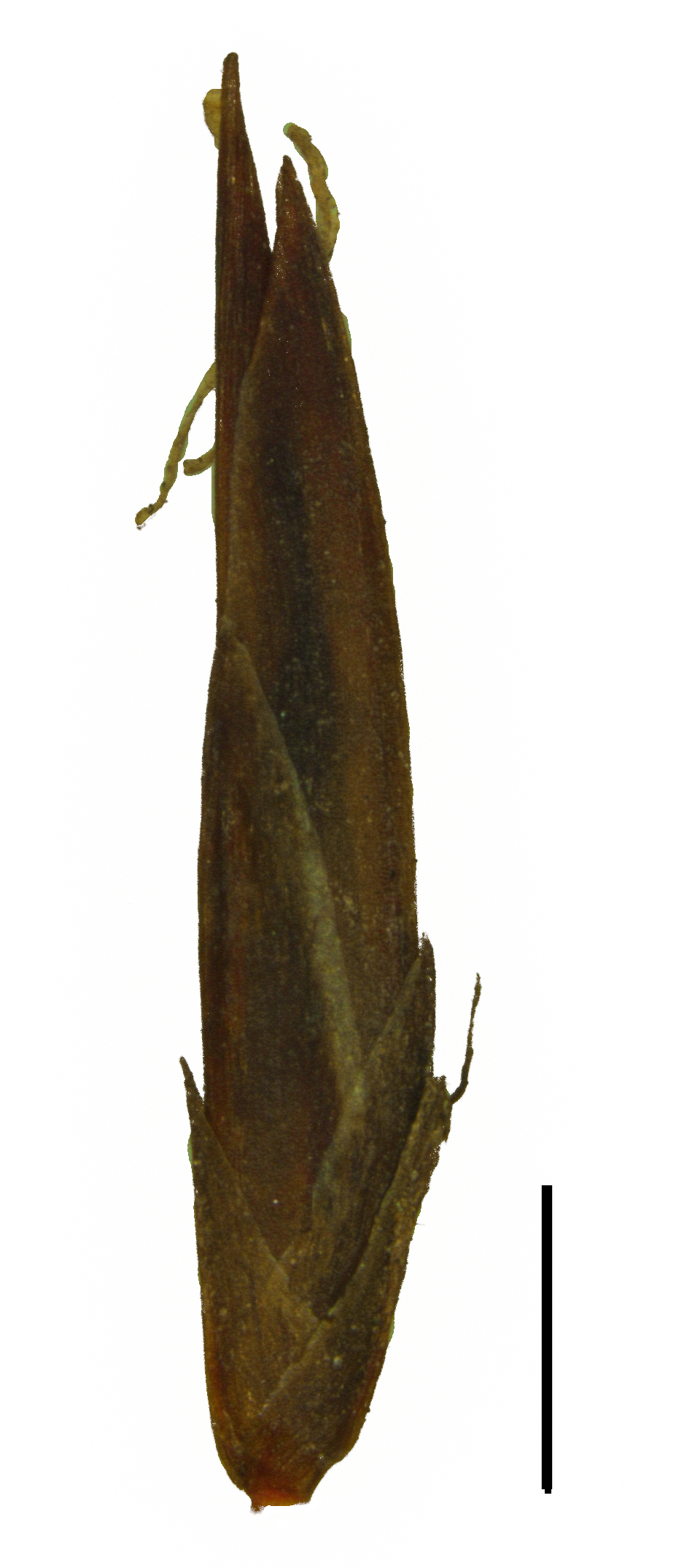
Spikelet (the black scale bar represents 1 mm)

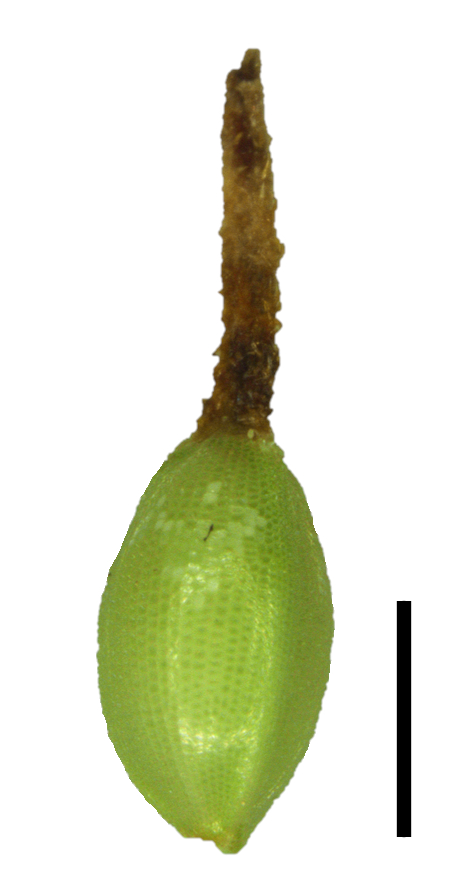
Nutlet (the black scale bar represents 1 mm)

== Taxonomy ==
Schoenus loreus is a species in family Cyperaceae, tribe Schoeneae. Other notable genera in tribe Schoeneae include Costularia, Lepidosperma, Oreobolus, Tetraria and Gahnia. Schoenus loreus is most closely related to other southern African Schoenus species, specifically, species in the S. cuspidatus and allies group.

The genus Tetraria once included species from the southern African Schoenus; however, based on molecular and morphological differences, we now know that the two groups are evolutionary distinct. To ensure that this group of sedges is monophyletic (i.e. the genus only has closely related species), several species of the southern African Tetraria and Epischoenus were transferred into Schoenus. In the field, the southern African Schoenus can be distinguished from Tetraria species by their lack of stem leaves and the absence of reticulate sheaths at the bases of the flowering stems.

== Distribution and habitat ==
Schoenus loreus generally occurs within 200 km of the south-eastern and south coasts of South Africa. A collection has been recorded from Mpumalanga Province, but is it It is unclear whether that specimen was collected from there or was mislabeled.

Specimens of S. loreus have been collected from a variety of habitats, including renosterveld, sandstone fynbos, thornveld, roadsides and grasslands. It is lowland species, generally found growing at locations less than 400 m.
