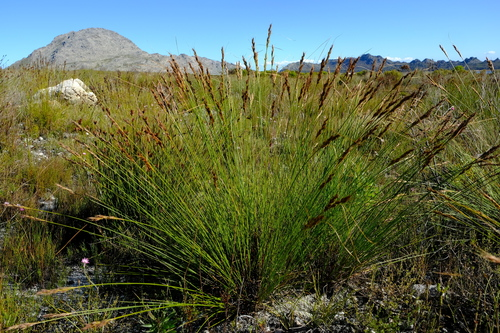
- Sharp veldrush

Scientific classification
- Kingdom: Plantae
- Clade: Tracheophytes
- Clade: Angiosperms
- Clade: Monocots
- Clade: Commelinids
- Order: Poales
- Family: Cyperaceae
- Genus: Schoenus
- Species: S. cuspidatus

Binomial name
- Schoenus cuspidatus Rottb.
- Documented collection localities

Synonyms
- Chaetospora cuspidata Nees; Elynanthus cuspidatus (Rottb.) Nees; Elynanthus cuspidatus (Rottb.) Nees var. setiformis Nees; Tetraria cuspidata (Rottb.) C.B.Clarke; Scirpus [as Schoenus] cuspidatus Roem. and Schult.; Elynanthus gracilis Nees; Tetraria cuspidata (Rottb.) C.B.Clarke var. f. gracilis (Nees) Kük.; Schoenus aristatus Nees ex Kunth, pro syn; Schoenus flexuosus Steud. ex Kunth, pro syn

= Schoenus cuspidatus =

Species of grass-like plant

Schoenus cuspidatus is a species of sedge endemic to the Cape region of South Africa where it is found in the provinces of Western Cape and Eastern Cape.

== Taxonomy ==
Schoenus cuspidatus is a species in the genus Schoenus of the family Cyperaceae, tribe Schoeneae. Other notable genera in tribe Schoeneae include Lepidosperma, Oreobolus, Costularia, Tetraria and Gahnia. The most closely related species to S. cuspidatus are other southern African Schoenus species, specifically, species in the S. cuspidatus and allies group.

Many Southern African Schoenus were once classified as Tetraria; however, based on a 2017 study of molecular and morphological characteristics, seventeen of the Tetraria were found to be more closely related Schoenus. To ensure that these genera of sedges are monophyletic (i.e. contain only species which are more closely related to each other than they are to species outside the group), these seventeen Tetraria were transferred into Schoenus. In the field, the southern African Schoenus can be distinguished from Tetraria species by their lack of stem leaves and the absence of reticulate sheaths at the bases of the flowering stems.

== Description ==
Schoenus cuspidatus is a species with significant vegetative and reproductive variability compared to closely related southern African Schoenus species. Its main diagnostic characters are its cuspidate spikelets and broad elliptic nutlets.

S. loreus has spikelets and nutlets that are similar in form to those of S. cuspidatus, but the former species has inflorescences that are wider and longer than those of S. cuspidatus and its leaves are usually relatively wide, non-channelled and flat compared to the more round-shaped leaves of S. cuspidatus.

A second similar species that has both spikelets and nutlets that are similar in form to S. cuspidatus is S. riparius. However, S. riparius is a larger, more robust species with a longer, more dense inflorescence compared to S. cuspidatus.

The current circumscription of S. cuspidatus is broad compared to other southern African Schoenus species, and further study is required to better understand this species. Currently, there are four main variants that have been identified: 1) Cederberg variant, 2) Cape Peninsula variant; 3) Western Cape mountain variant; and 4) Eastern variant. These variants are not delineated as independent species because of the presence of intermediates between them.

Similar to other sedges, plants in this group are very difficult to identify. It appears that part of this problem is caused by the tendency of the southern African Schoenus to form hybrids with each other. It appears that S. cuspidatus forms hybrids with other southern African Schoenus species, specifically species in the S. cuspidatus and allies group.

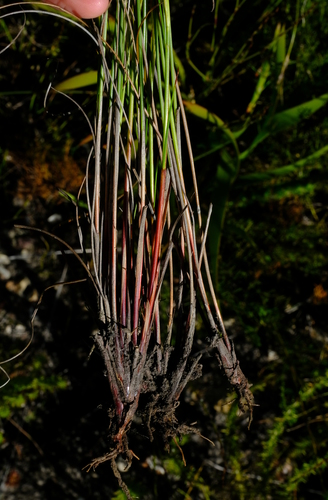
Bases of flowering stems (culms)

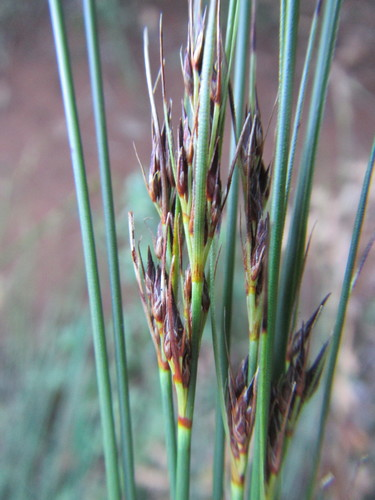
Flowering heads (inflorescences)

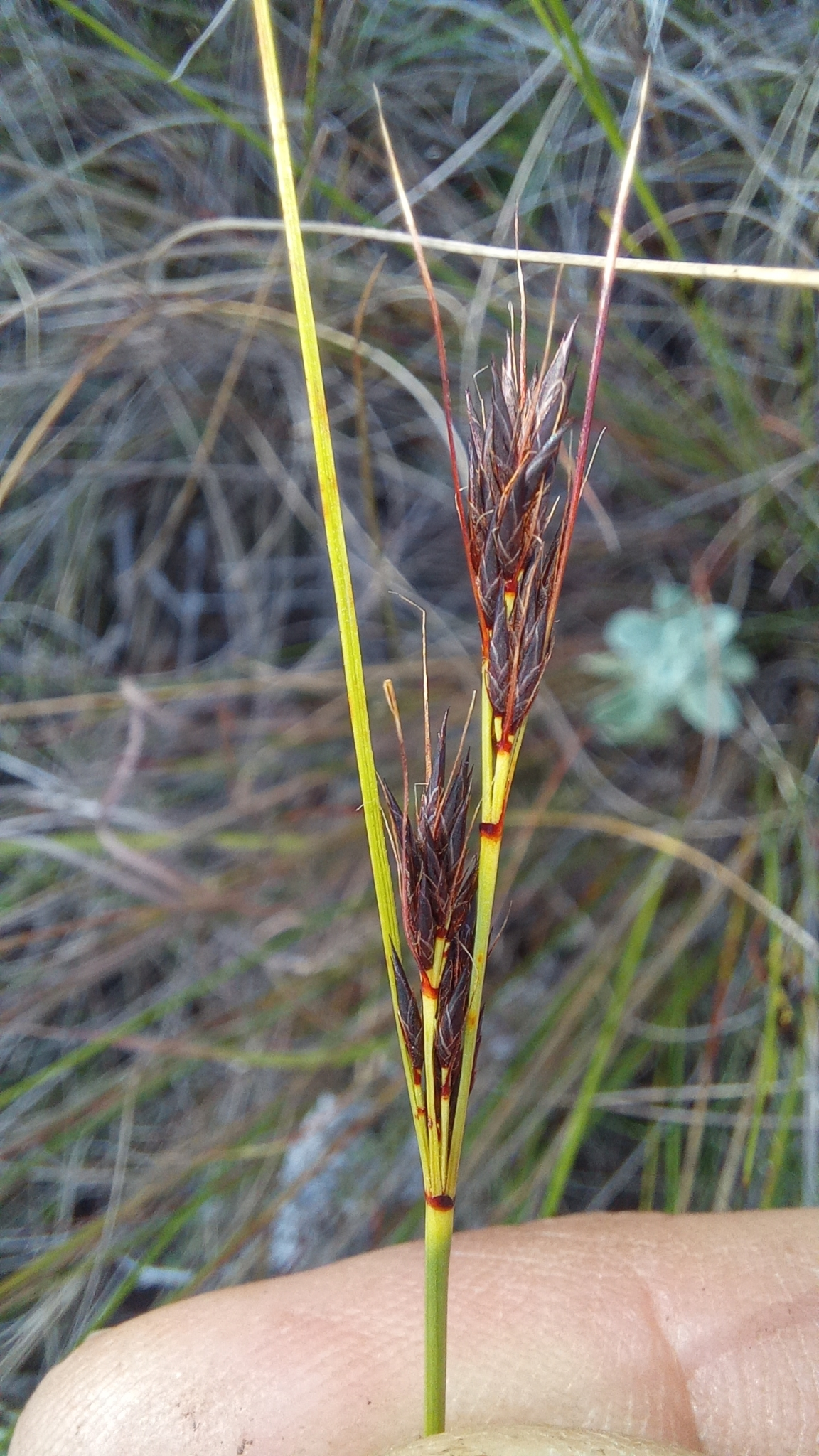
Flowering head

Spikelet

Nutlet

== Distribution and habitat ==
Schoenus cuspidatus is a species of sedge with a relatively wide geographic distribution compared to other closely related species in its group. It grows throughout the Western Cape and Eastern Cape Provinces of South Africa across a wide elevational range. This species can be found growing in a variety of parent materials in both wet and dry habitats, but it is most often found on mountain slopes.

== Gallery ==
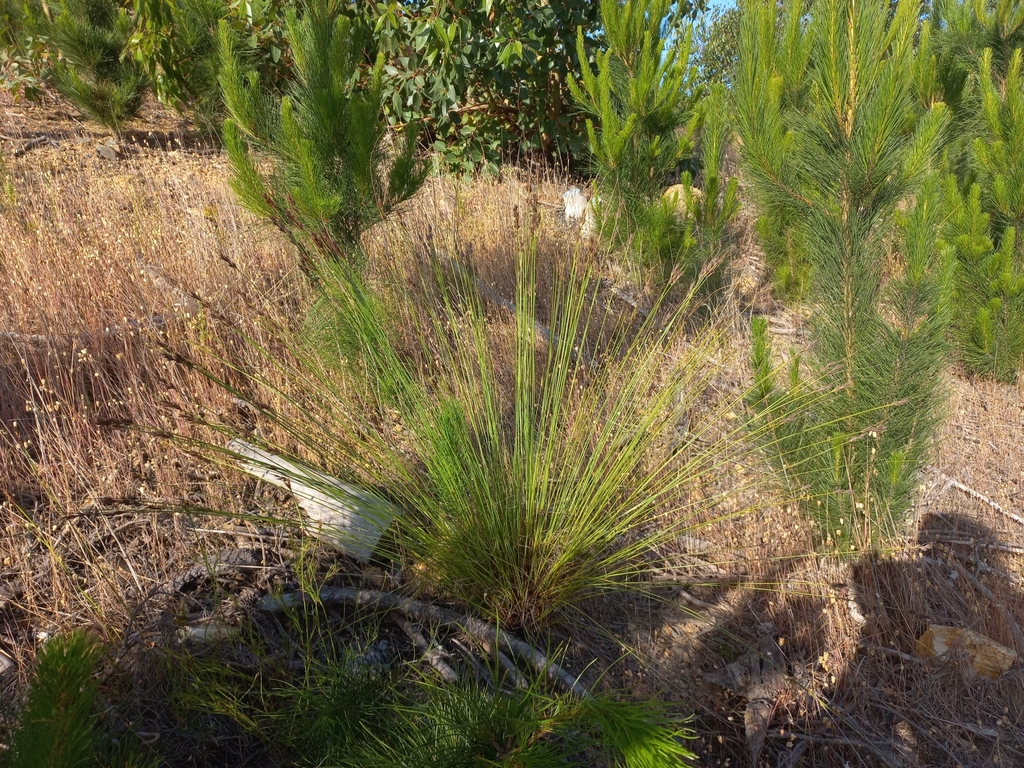
Growth form

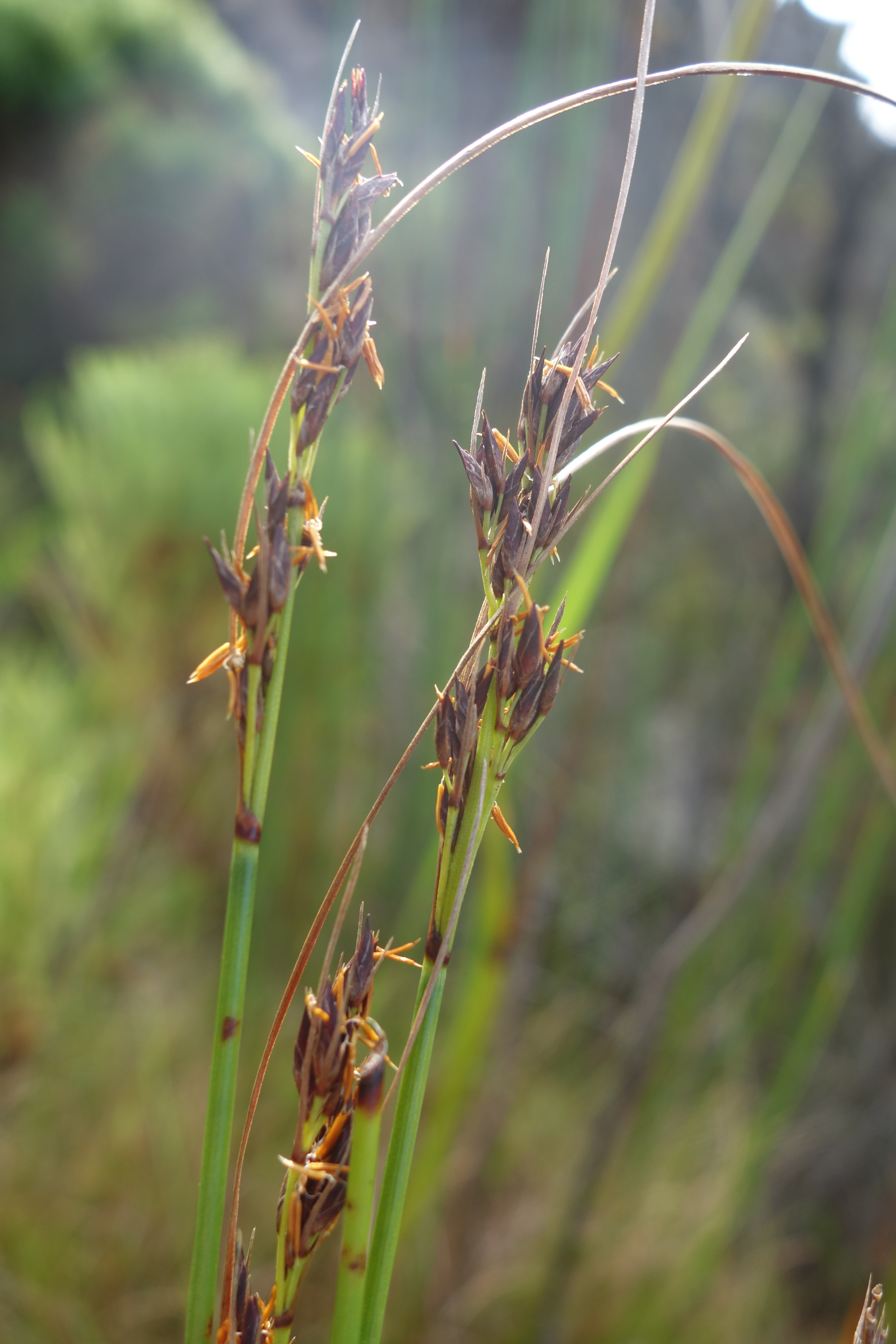
Flowering heads

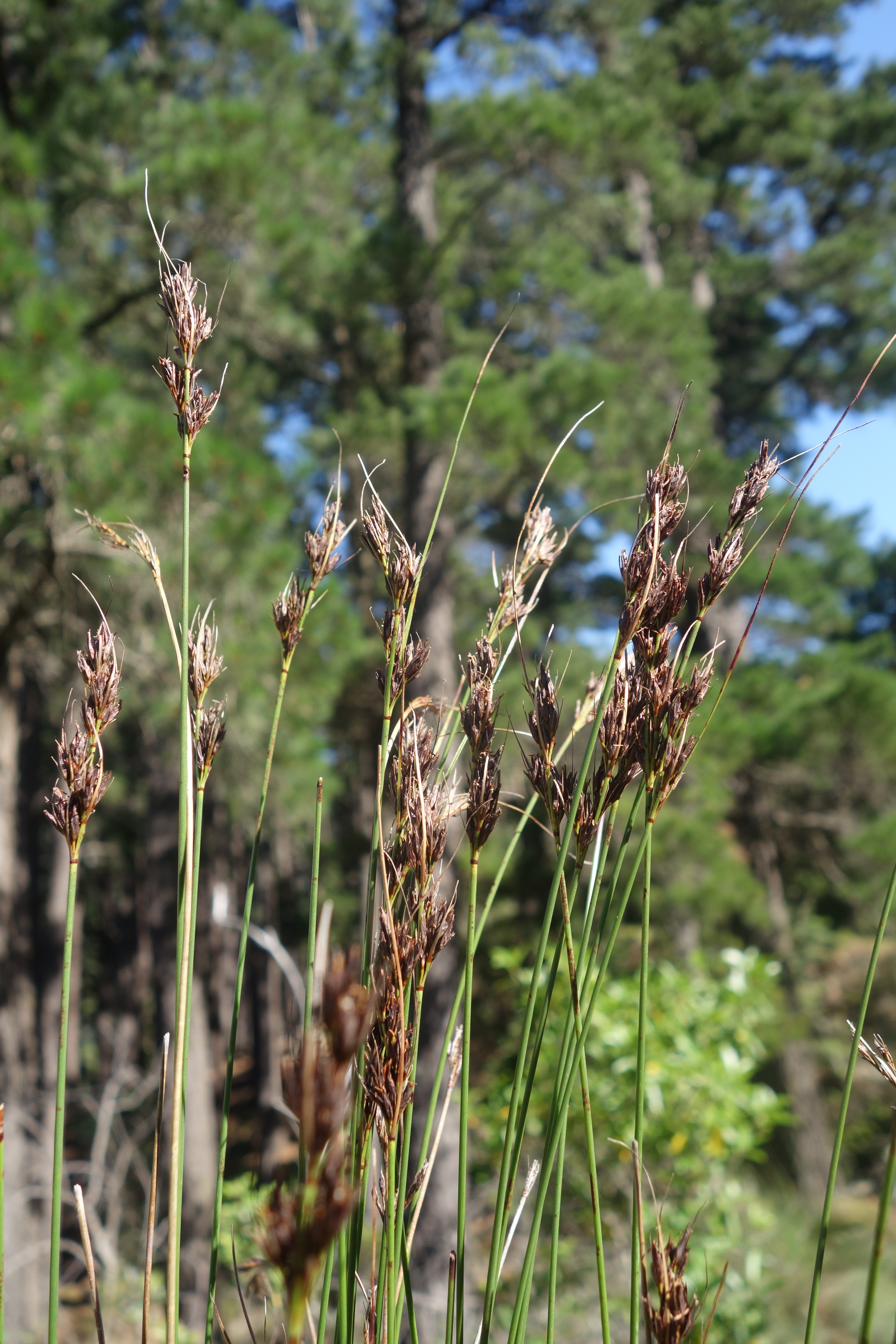
Flowering heads

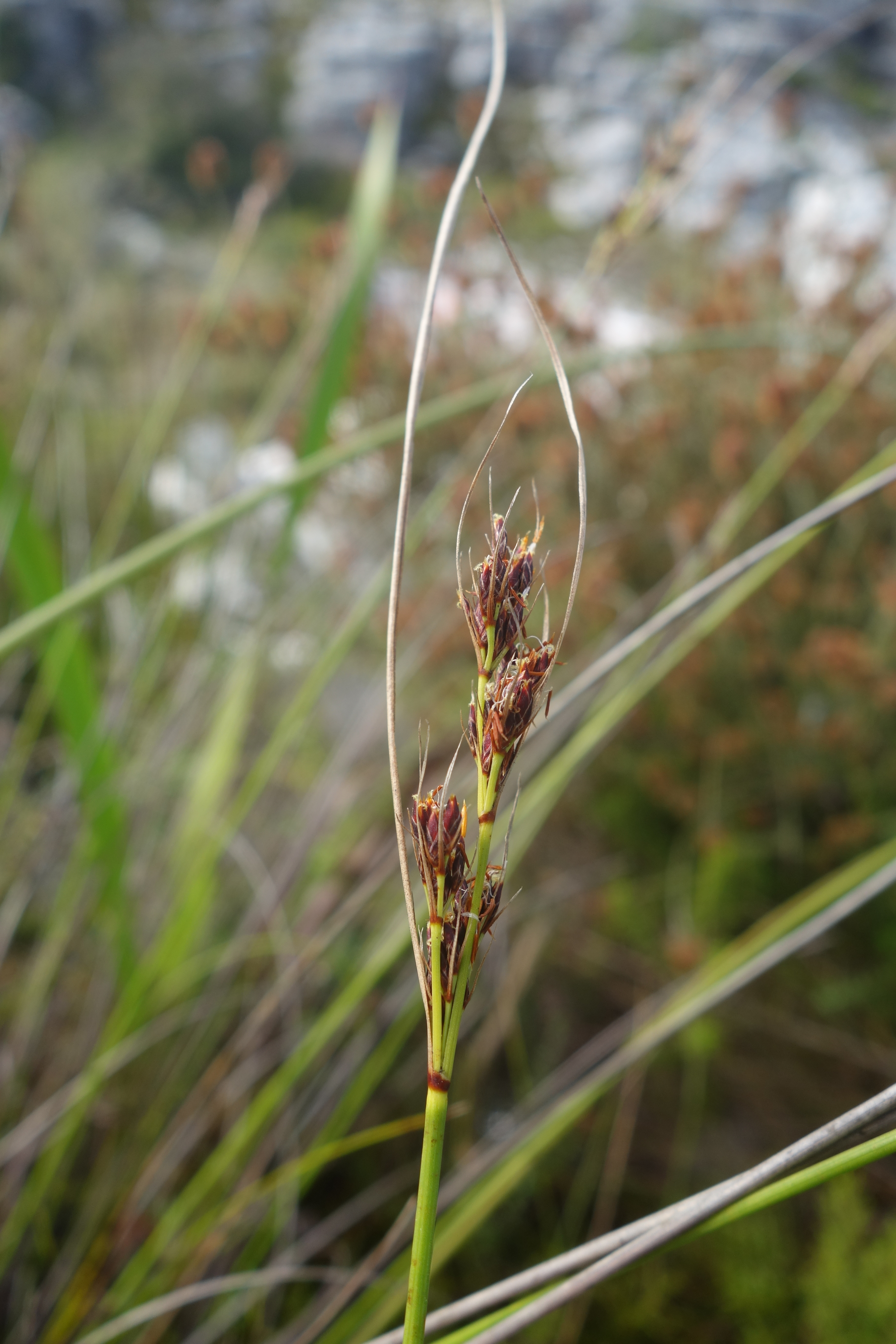
Flowering head
