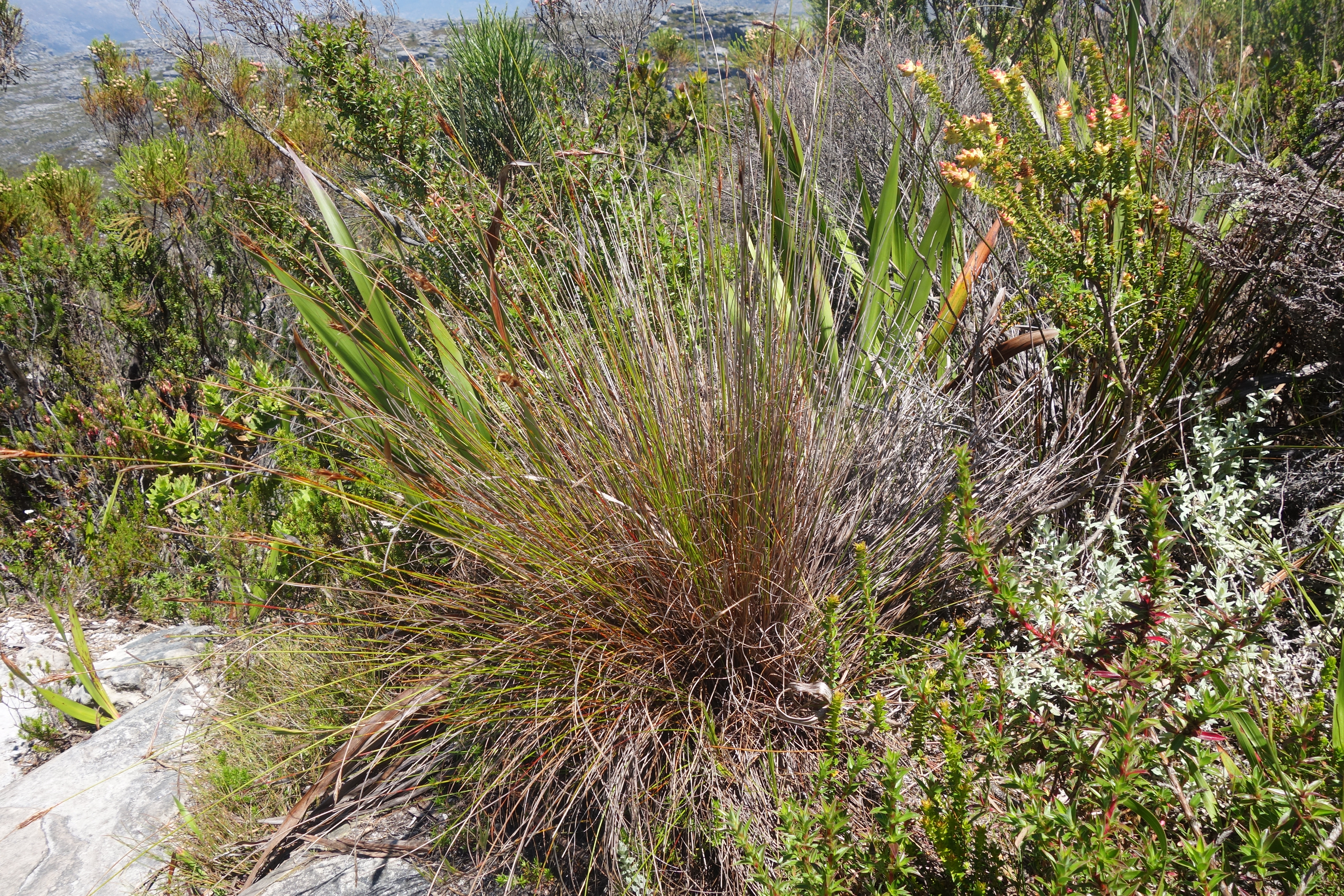
- Congested veldrush

Scientific classification
- Kingdom: Plantae
- Clade: Tracheophytes
- Clade: Angiosperms
- Clade: Monocots
- Clade: Commelinids
- Order: Poales
- Family: Cyperaceae
- Genus: Schoenus
- Species: S. compactus

Binomial name
- Schoenus compactus (Levyns) T.L.Elliott & Muasya
- Documented collection localities in South Africa

Synonyms
- Tetraria compacta Levyns

= Schoenus compactus =

Species of grass-like plant

Schoenus compactus is a species of sedge endemic to south-western South Africa.

== Description ==
The main distinguishing morphological characters of S. compactus are its short, dense and compact (or congested) inflorescences and its firm sheaths and ligules.

Schoenus compactus closely resembles Schoenus auritus, but the former species has firm ligules and sheaths, whereas S. auritus has membranaceous sheaths and ligules.

A second species that is very similar to S. compactus is Schoenus crassus. These two species both have thickened and firm primary inflorescence bracts and prophylls, which often have an orange-coloured tinge. The main difference between S. compactus and S. crassus, however, is that the inflorescence of S. compactus is short and congested with the spikes overlapping almost completely, whereas that of S. crassus is more elongate with the spikes overlapping only partially. In addition, S. crassus tends to be a more robust species than S. compactus.

Similar to other sedges, plants in this group are very difficult to identify. It appears that part of this problem is caused by the tendency of the southern African Schoenus to form hybrids with each other. Schoenus compactus might form hybrids with other southern African Schoenus species, but the preliminary evidence is inconclusive. If S. compactus does form hybrids with other southern African Schoenus species, it is most likely to hybridize with other species in the S. cuspidatus and allies group.

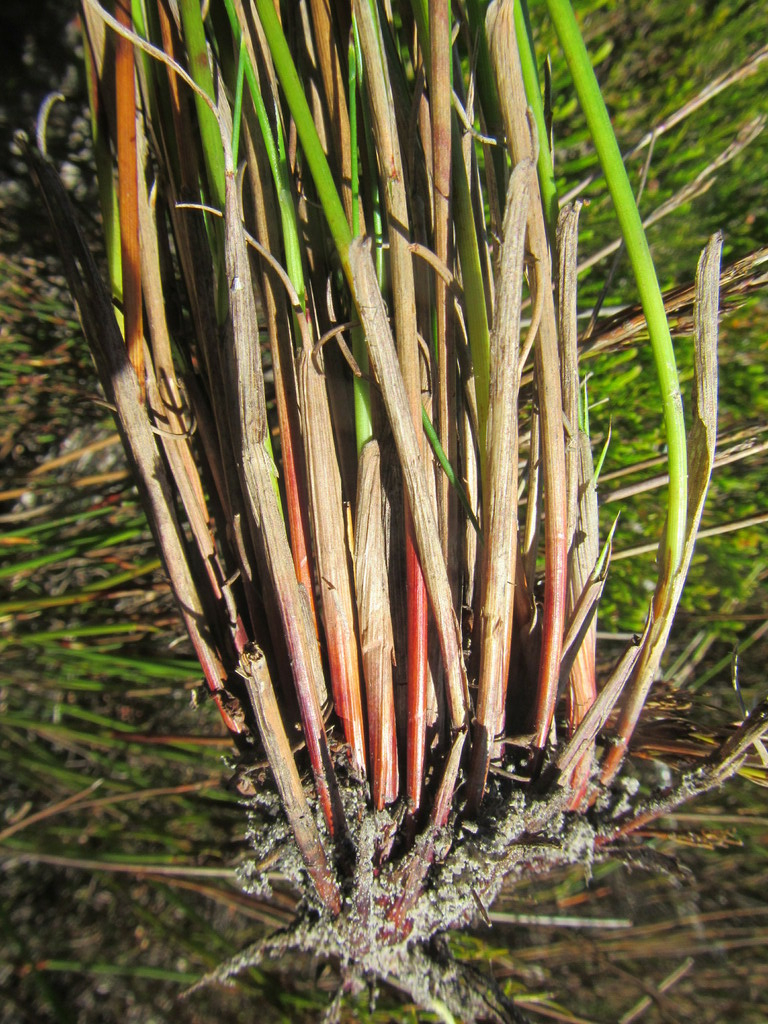
Base of flowering stems (culms)

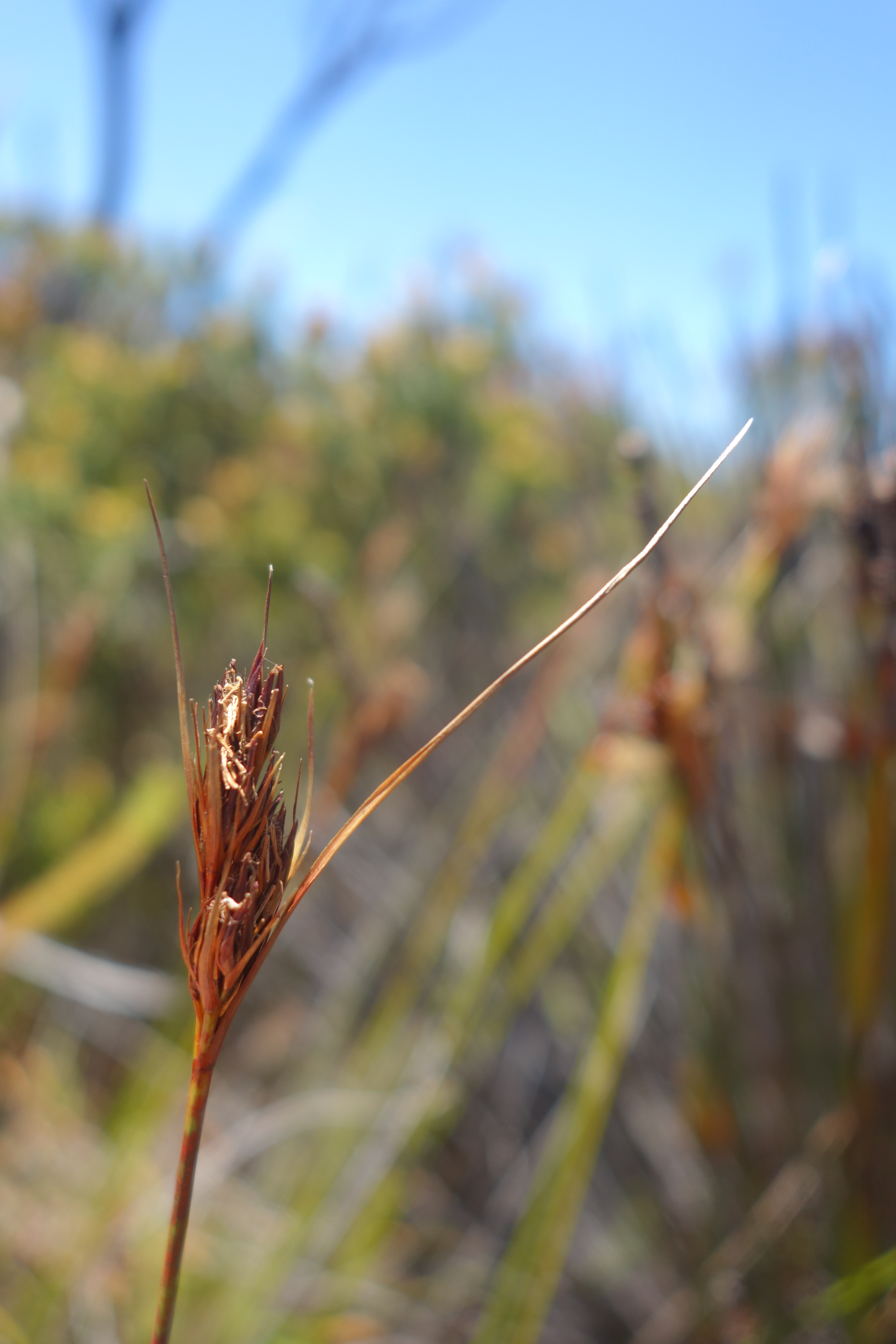
Flowering head (inflorescence)

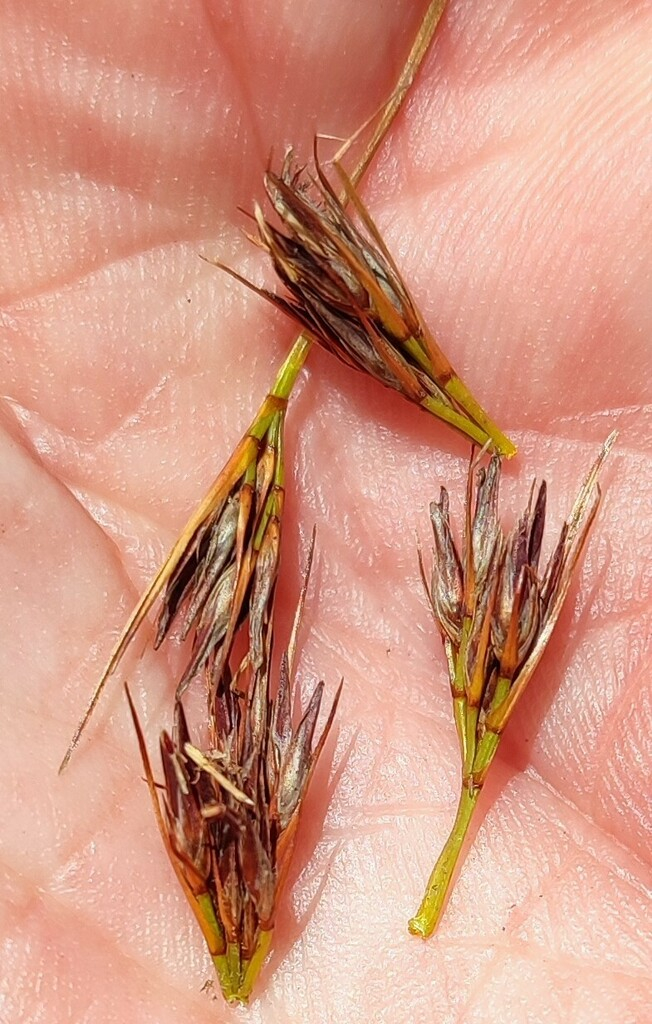
Flower spikes

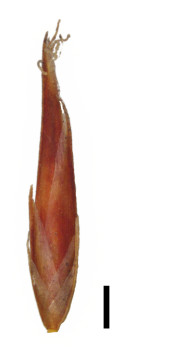
Spikelet (the black scale bar represents 1 mm)

Nutlet (the black scale bar represents 1 mm)

== Taxonomy ==
Schoenus compactus is a species in family Cyperaceae, tribe Schoeneae. Other notable genera in tribe Schoeneae include Lepidosperma, Oreobolus, Costularia, Tetraria and Gahnia. The most closely related species to S. compactus are other southern African Schoenus species, specifically, species in the S. cuspidatus and allies group.

Southern African Schoenus were once classified as Tetraria; however, based on molecular and morphological differences, we now know that the two groups are evolutionary distinct. To ensure that this group of sedges is monophyletic (i.e. the genus only has closely related species), several species of Epischoenus and the southern African Tetraria were transferred into Schoenus. In the field, the southern African Schoenus can be distinguished from Tetraria species by their lack of stem leaves and the absence of reticulate sheaths at the bases of the flowering stems.

== Distribution and habitat ==
Schoenus compactus has been found growing in south-western South Africa, with its distribution extending from the Cape Peninsula in the west to the Riviersonderend Mountains in the east. To date, most collections have been made from coarse-textured soils in the fynbos vegetation type.

== Gallery ==
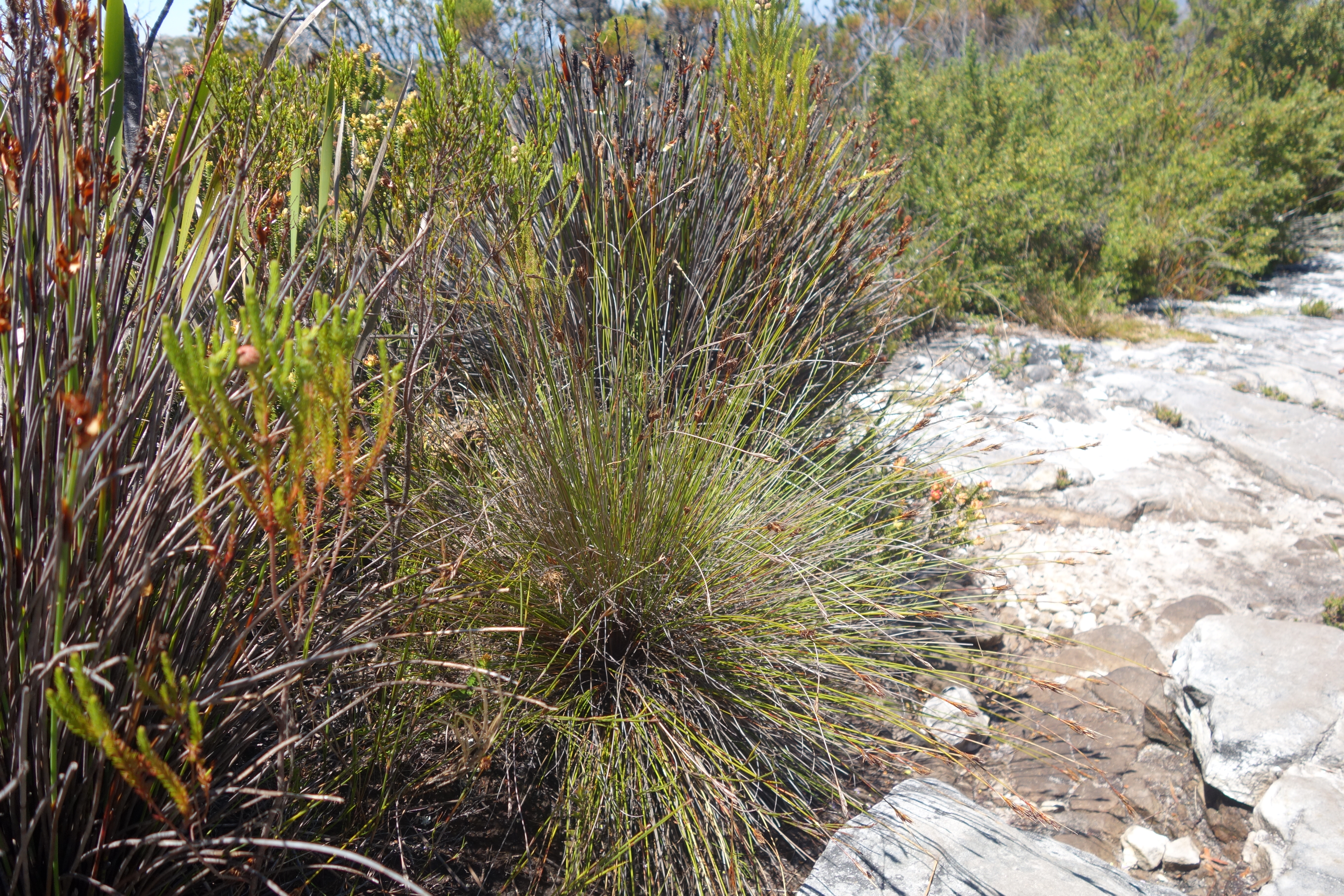
Growth form of Schoenus compactus

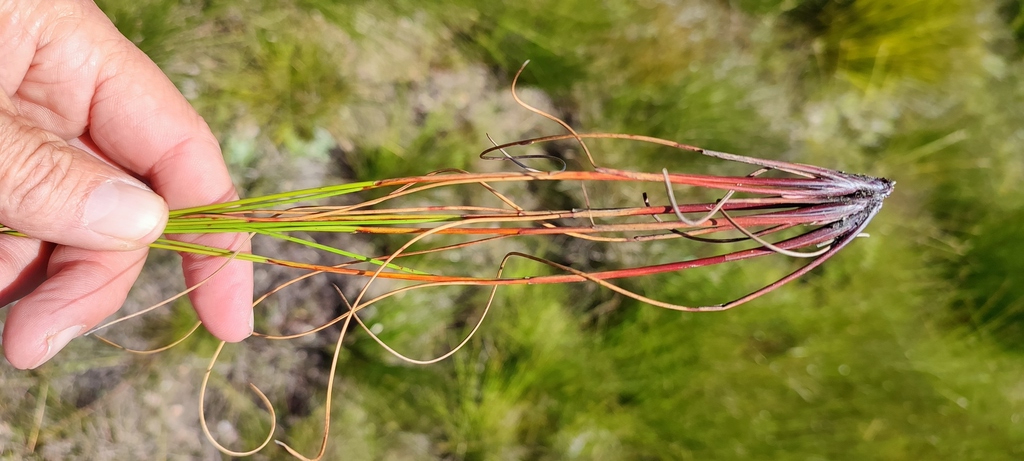
Base of flowering stems

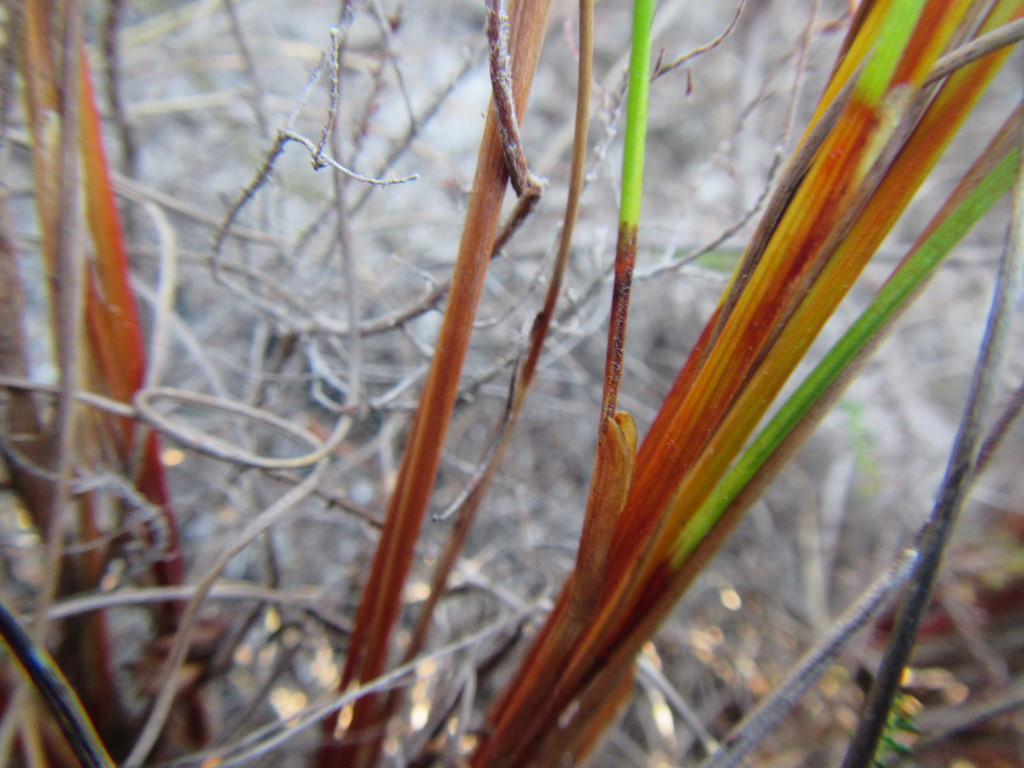
Base of flowering stems

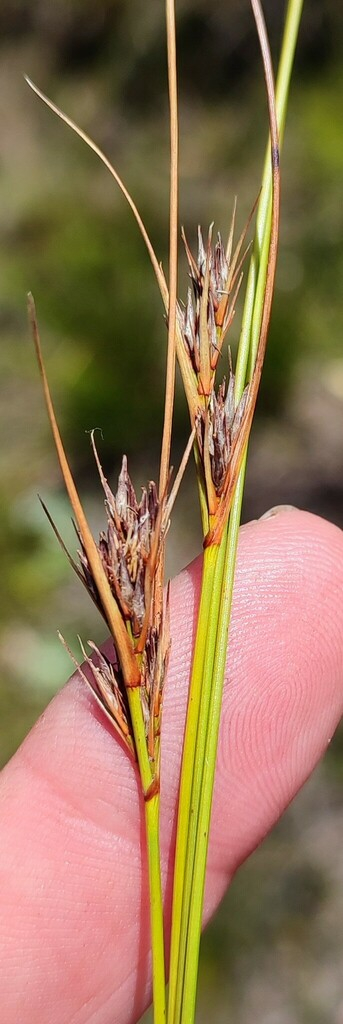
Flowering heads

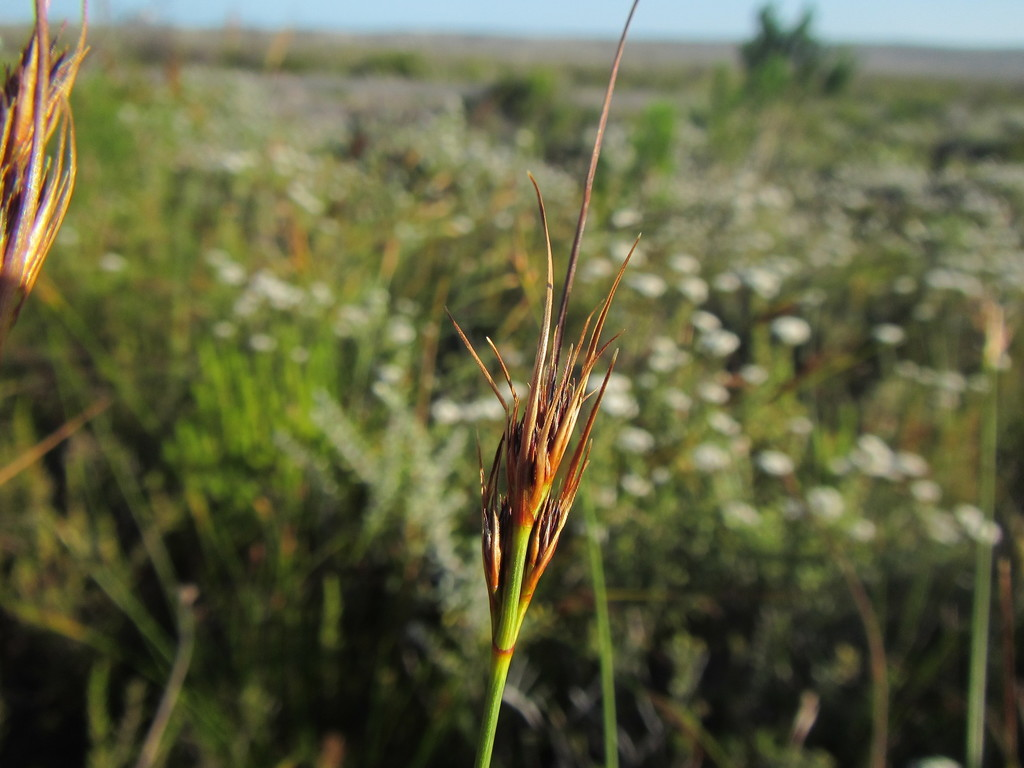
Flowering head

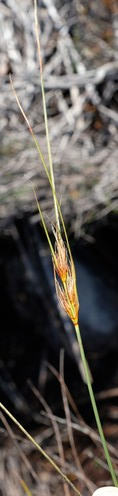
Flowering head

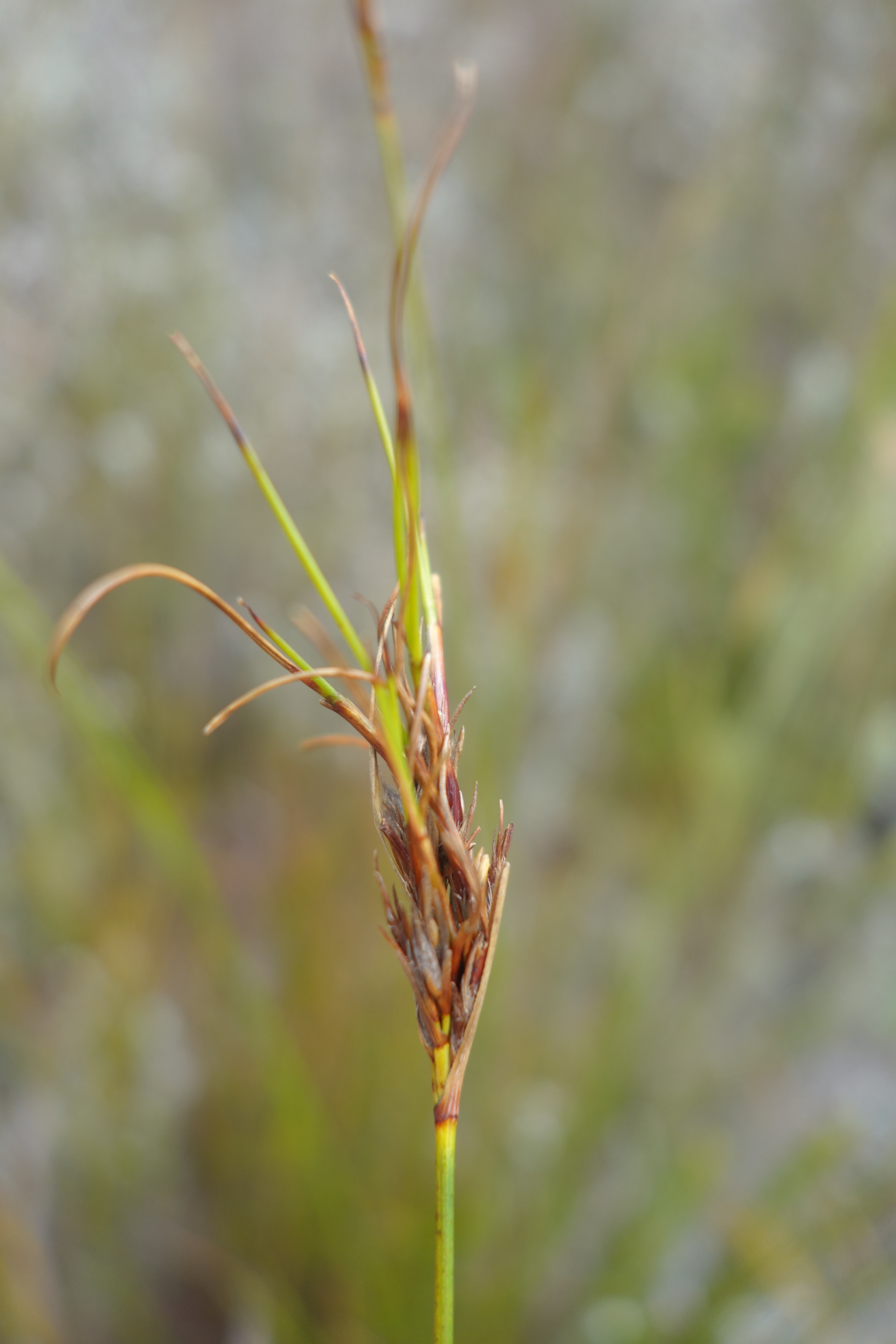
Pseudo-vivipary in Schoenus compactus
