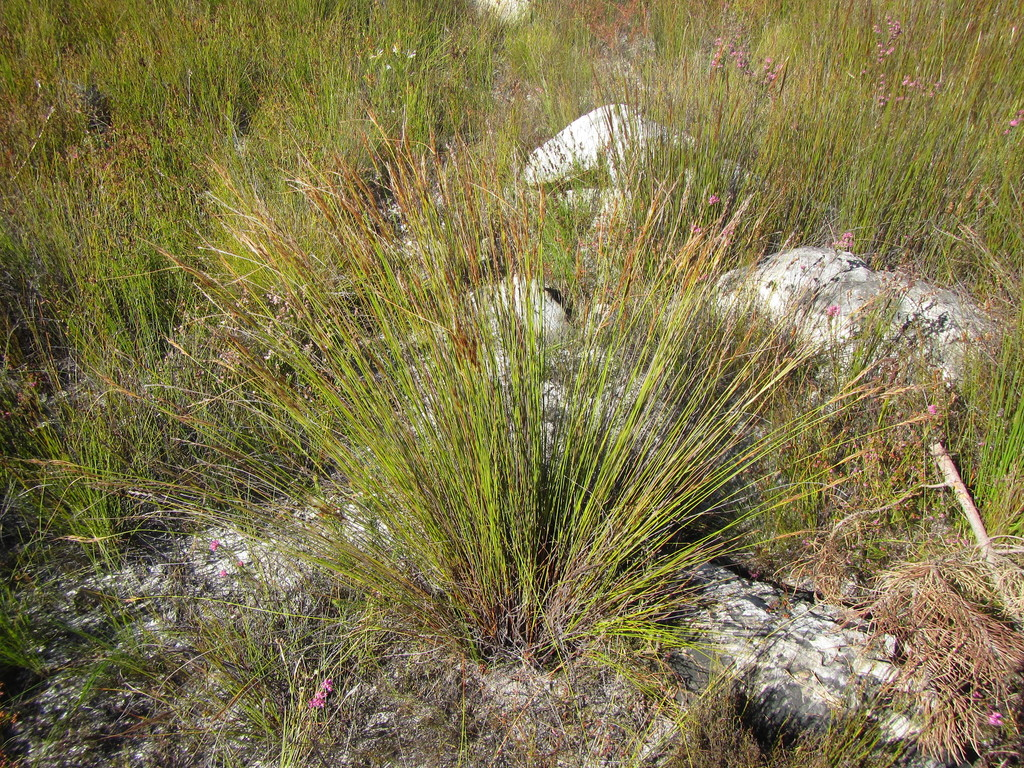
- Robust veldrush

Scientific classification
- Kingdom: Plantae
- Clade: Tracheophytes
- Clade: Angiosperms
- Clade: Monocots
- Clade: Commelinids
- Order: Poales
- Family: Cyperaceae
- Genus: Schoenus
- Species: S. crassus

Binomial name
- Schoenus crassus (Levyns) T.L.Elliott & Muasya
- Documented collection localities in South Africa

Synonyms
- Tetraria crassa Levyns; Elynanthes microstachyus Boeckeler, pro parte; Schoenus microstachyus (Boeckeler) Kuntze

= Schoenus crassus =

Species of grass-like plant

Schoenus crassus is a species of sedge endemic to south-western South Africa.

== Description ==
Schoenus crassus is a robust species, with plants usually having stiff, upright leaves. Other notable morphological characters include its firm and thickened primary inflorescence bracts, prophylls and prophyll mucros. In addition, this species has aristate spikelets.

Schoenus crassus closely resembles Schoenus compactus, but the former species has a more elongate flowering head (inflorescence) compared to that of the latter.

A second species that is very similar to S. crassus is Schoenus cuspidatus. Whereas the spikelets of S. crassus are aristate in form with relatively longer lower glumes, those of S compactus are cuspidate and have relatively shorter lower glumes. Furthermore, S. crassus has more thickened and firm primary inflorescence bracts, prophylls and prophyll mucros compared to S. cuspidatus. Finally, the overall growth form of S. crassus appears more stiff and rigid compared to the more lax-looking S. cuspidatus, which often has curled leaves.

Similar to other sedges, plants in this group are very difficult to identify. It appears that part of this problem is caused by the tendency of the southern African Schoenus to form hybrids with each other. Preliminary evidence suggests that Schoenus crassus forms hybrids with other southern African Schoenus species.

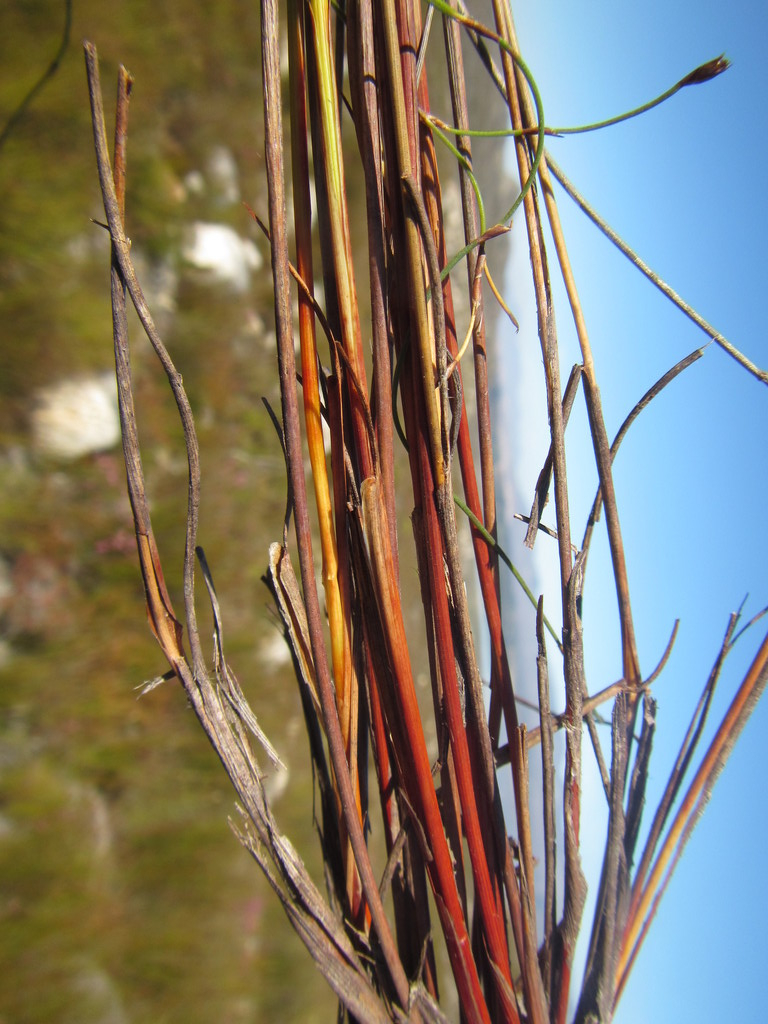
Base of flowering stems (culms)

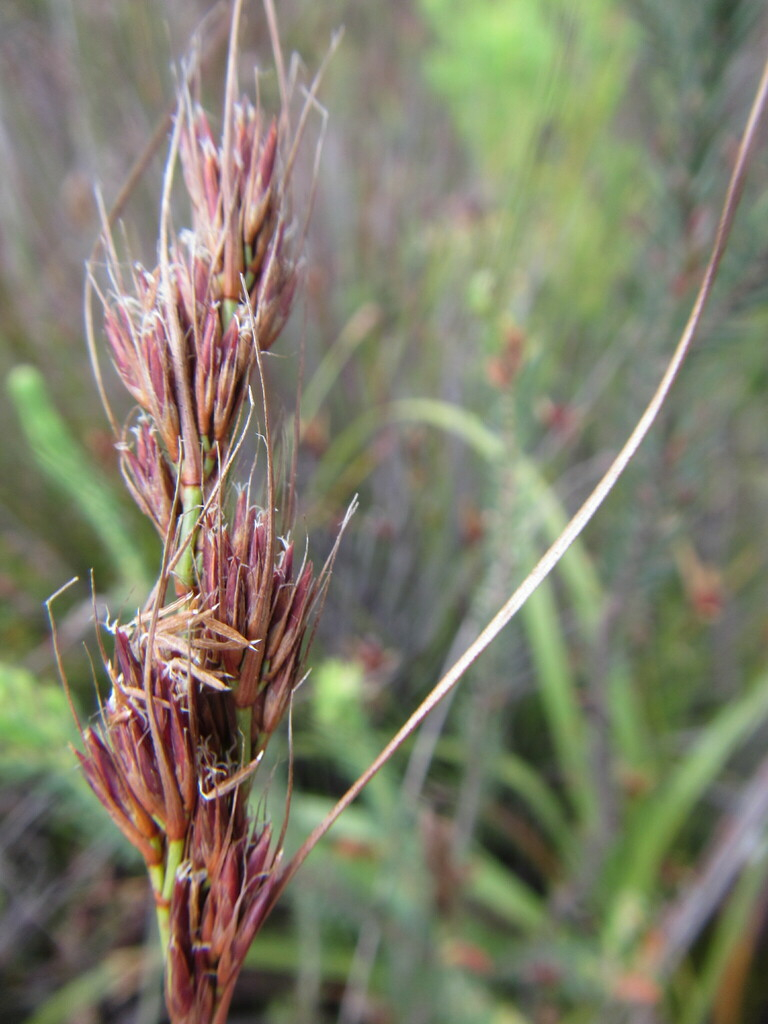
Flowering head

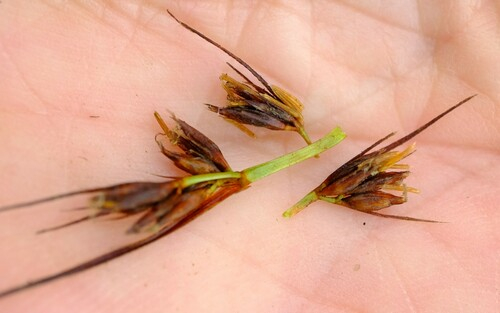
Flower spikes

Spikelet (the black scale bar represents 1 mm)

Nutlet (the black scale bar represents 1 mm)

== Taxonomy ==
Schoenus crassus is a species in family Cyperaceae, tribe Schoeneae. Other notable genera in tribe Schoeneae include Lepidosperma, Oreobolus, Costularia, Tetraria and Gahnia. The most closely related species to S. crassus are other southern African Schoenus species, specifically, species in the S. cuspidatus and allies group.

Southern African Schoenus were once classified as Tetraria; however, based on molecular and morphological differences, we now know that the two groups are evolutionary distinct. To ensure that this group of sedges is monophyletic (i.e. the genus only has closely related species), several species of Epischoenus and the southern African Tetraria were transferred into Schoenus. In the field, the southern African Schoenus can be distinguished from Tetraria species by their lack of stem leaves and the absence of reticulate sheaths at the bases of the flowering stems.

== Distribution and habitat ==
Schoenus crassus has been found growing in south-western South Africa, with its distribution extending from the Cape Peninsula in the west to the Langeberg Mountain range in the east. Based on collection data and field observations, it is a species that generally prefers sandstone-derived soils in the fynbos vegetation type. Specimens have been collected from other sites, however, including those with granite and limestone parent material.

== Gallery ==
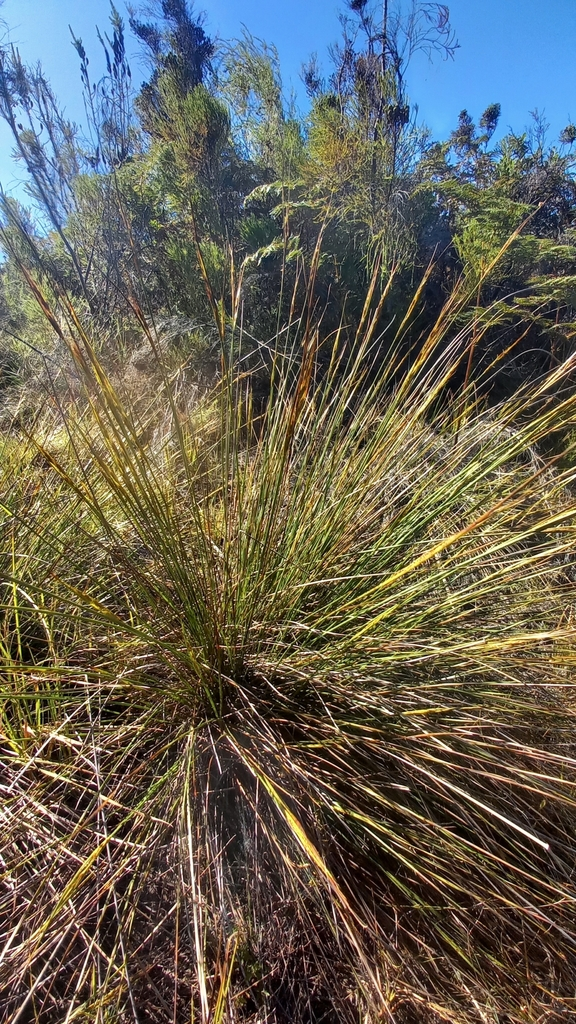
Growth form

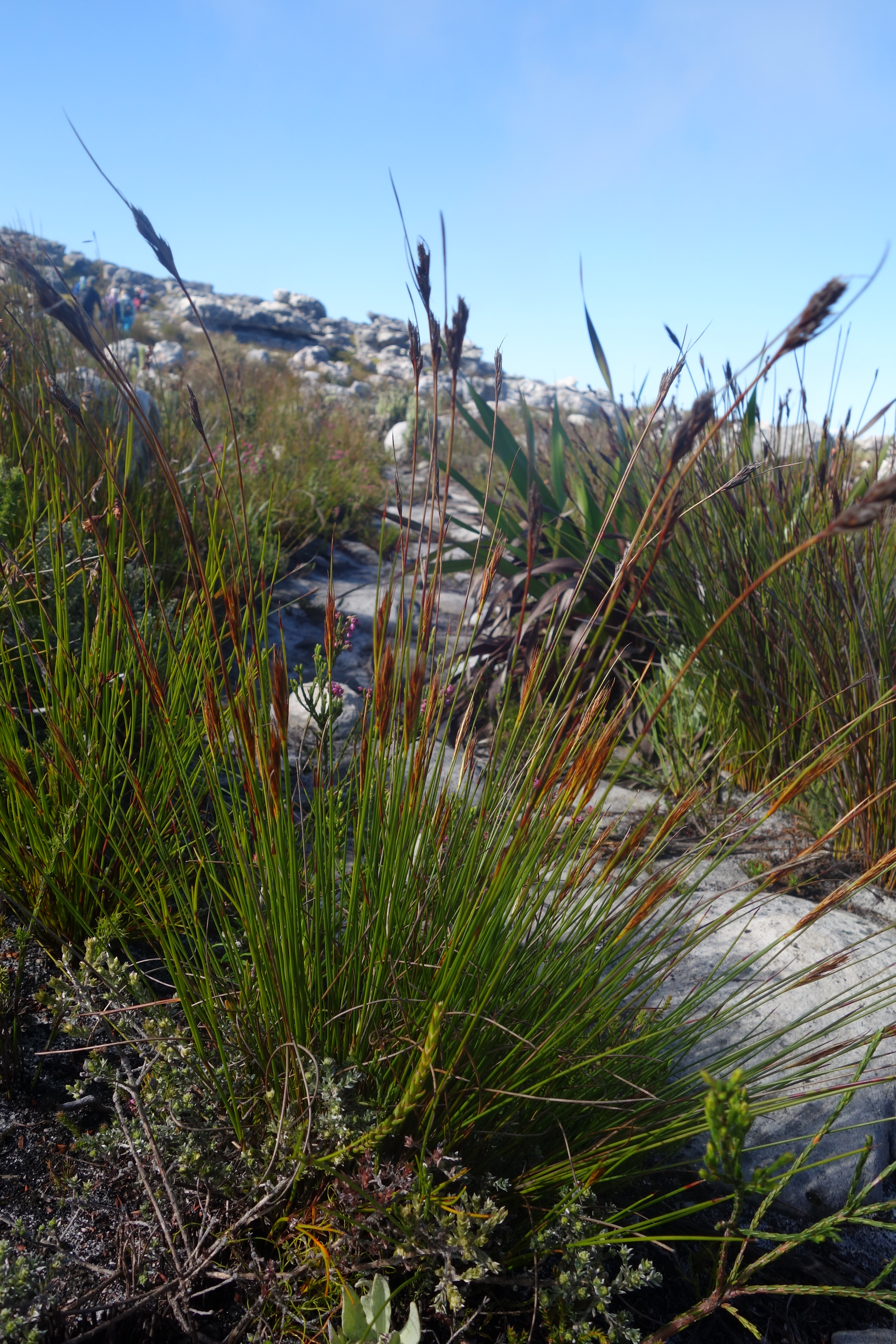
Growth form

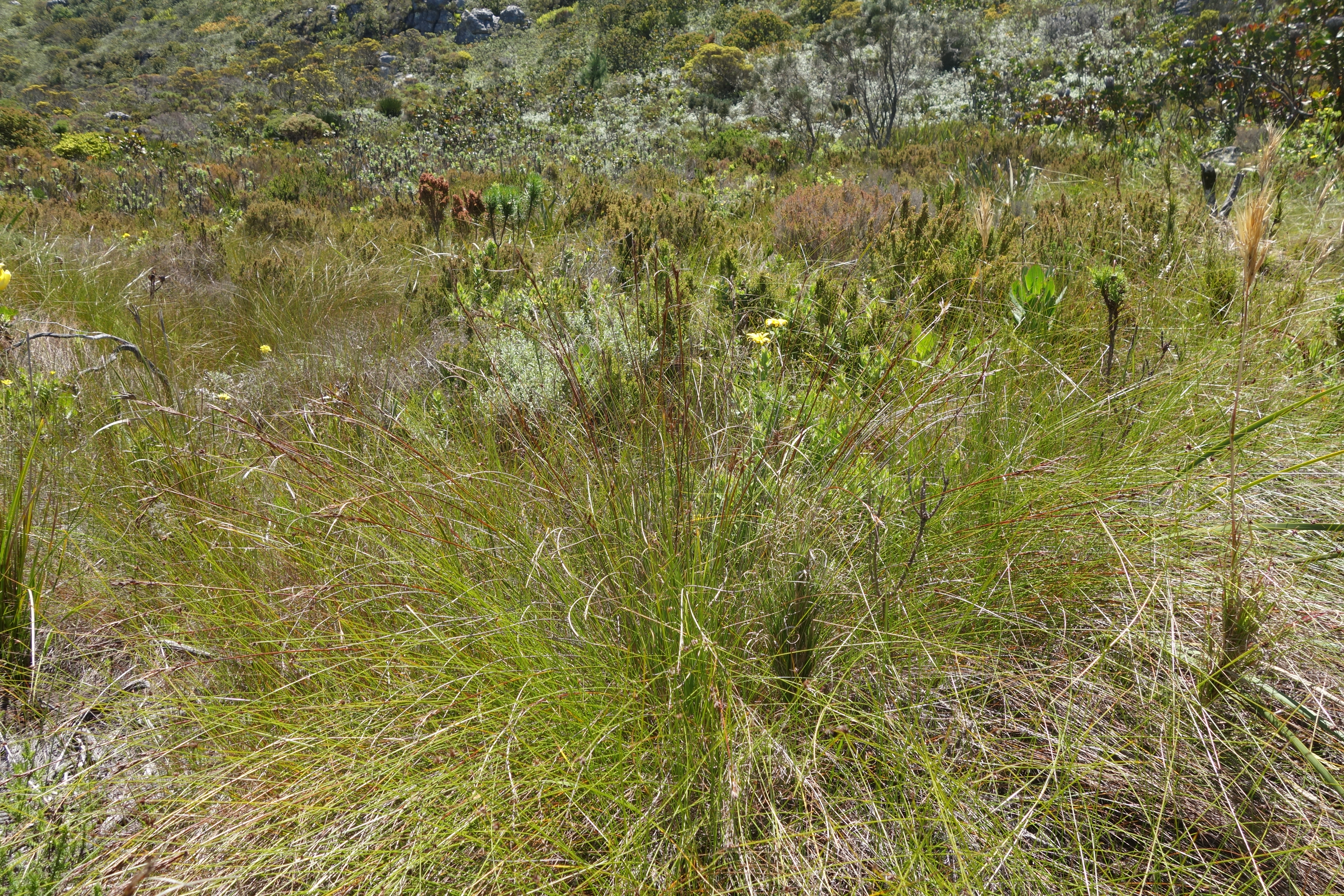
Growth form

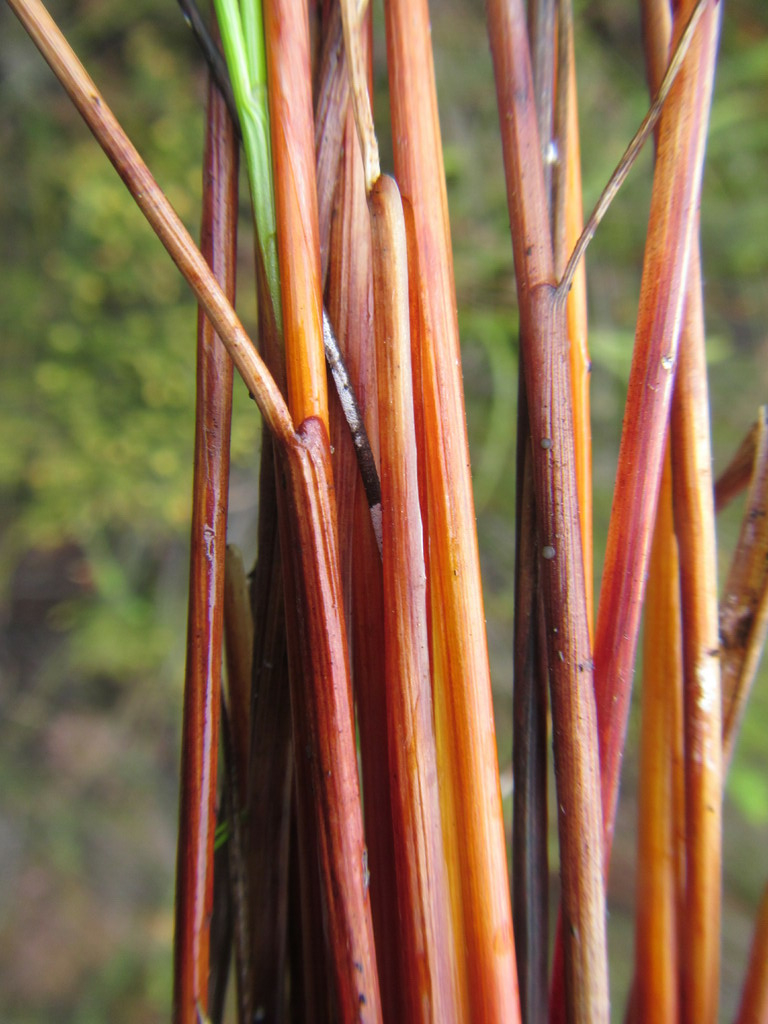
Base of culms

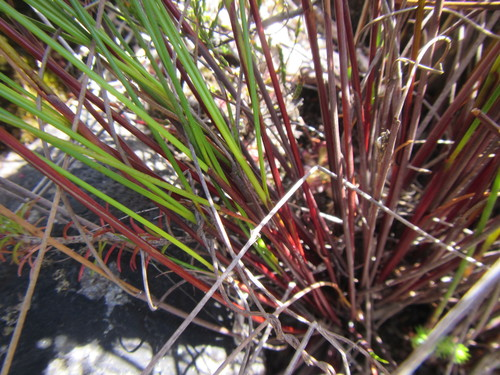
Base of culms

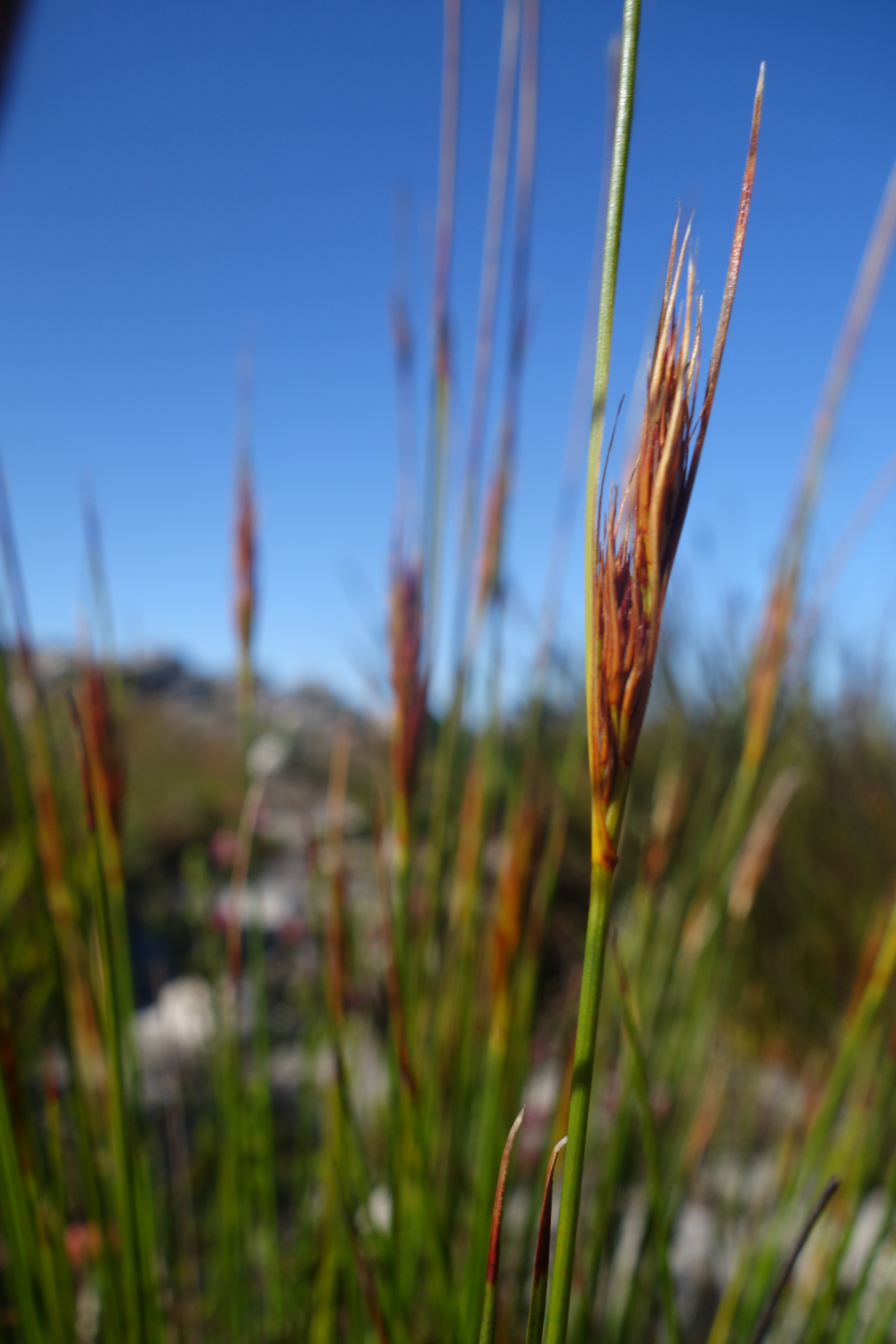
Flowering heads (inflorescences)

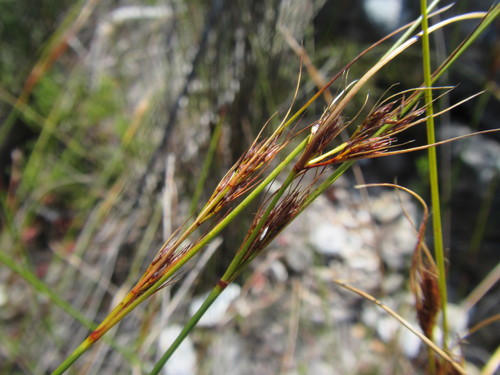
Flowering heads

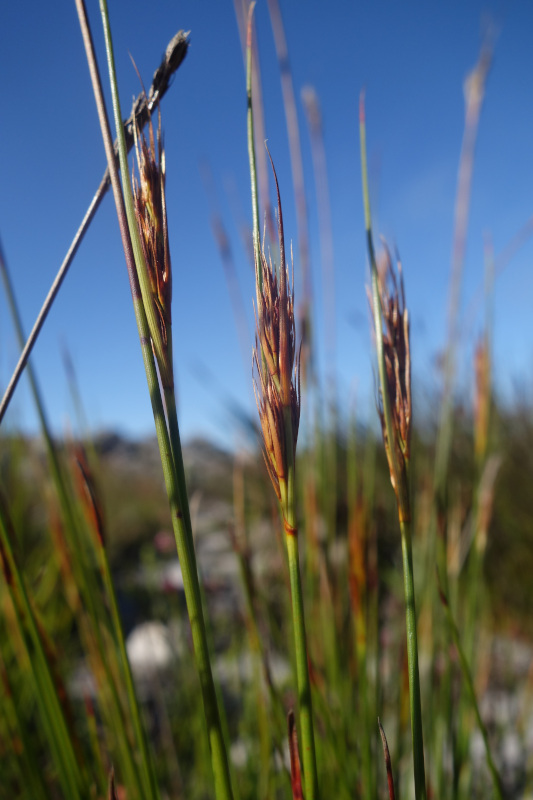
Flowering heads

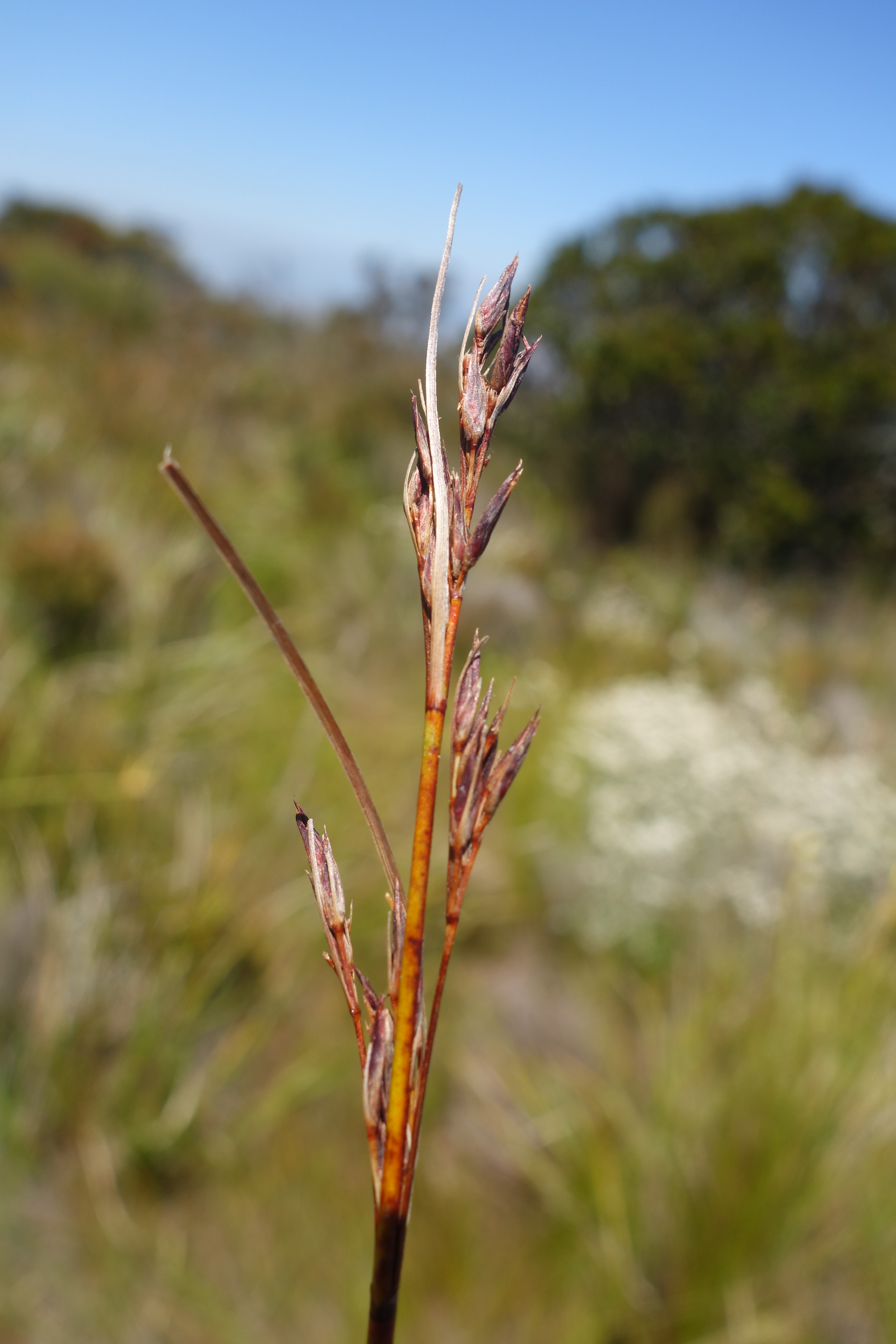
Old flowering head

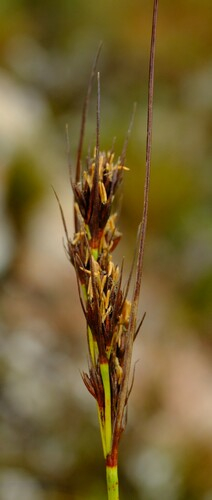
Flowering head

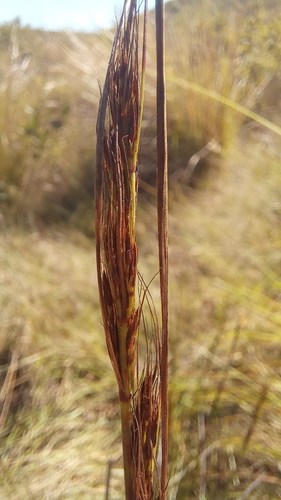
Flowering head
