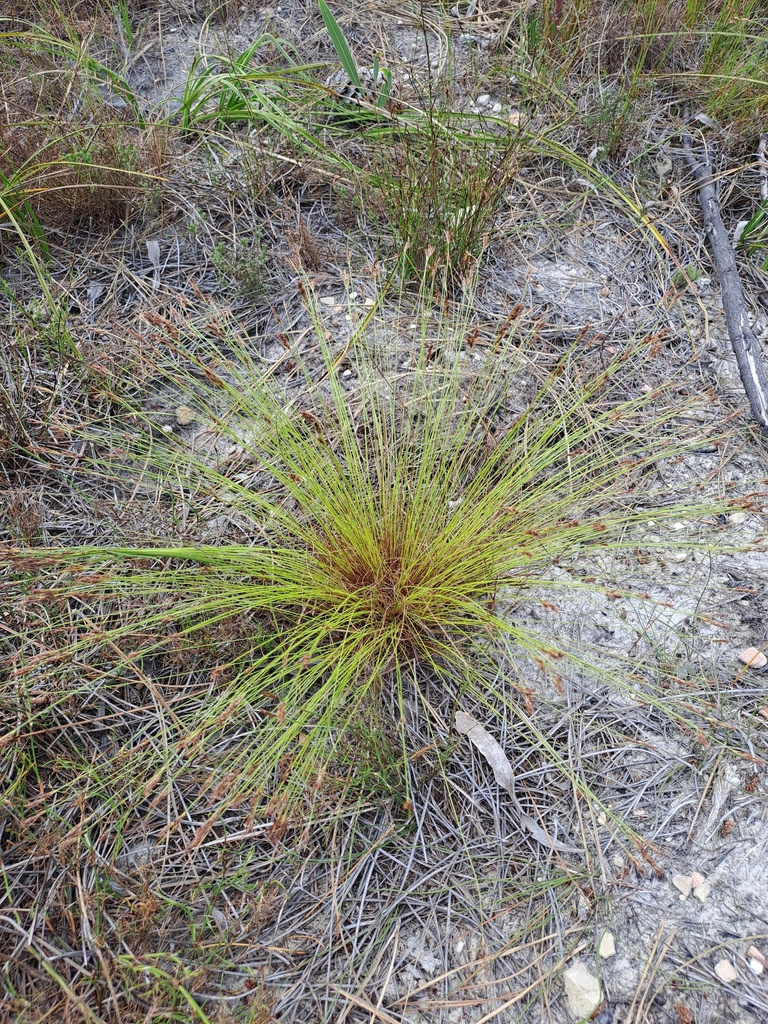
- Limestone veldrush

Scientific classification
- Kingdom: Plantae
- Clade: Tracheophytes
- Clade: Angiosperms
- Clade: Monocots
- Clade: Commelinids
- Order: Poales
- Family: Cyperaceae
- Genus: Schoenus
- Species: S. calceolus

Binomial name
- Schoenus calceolus T.L.Elliott & Muasya
- Documented collection localities

= Schoenus calceolus =

Species of grass-like plant

Schoenus calceolus is a species of sedge endemic to limestone-derived soils in the Agulhas Plain region of South Africa.

== Description ==
A unique diagnostic character of S. calceolus is the flat culm bases held together by a thin translucent sheath, which can sometimes be twisted.

Schoenus calceolus has ovate spikelets that are similar in form to those of Schoenus prophyllus and Schoenus purpurascens. Compared to the wider, non-channelled leaves of S. purpurascens, those of S. calceolus are channelled and more slender. In addition, S. calceolus has less firm prophylls that are not shiny in contrast to the shiny and relatively long prophylls of S. prophyllus. The prophyll mucros (awns) of S. prophyllus are relatively long (>3.0 mm) compared to the relatively short mucros (<2.4 mm) of S. calceolus.

Schoenus prophyllus often grows near S. calceolus, but the flattened culm base and straight leaves of the latter species differ from those of S. prophyllus, whose leaves curl with age.

Similar to other sedges, plants in this group are very difficult to identify. It appears that part of this problem is caused by the tendency of the southern African Schoenus to form hybrids with each other. It is not clear whether S. calceolus forms hybrids with other southern African Schoenus species.

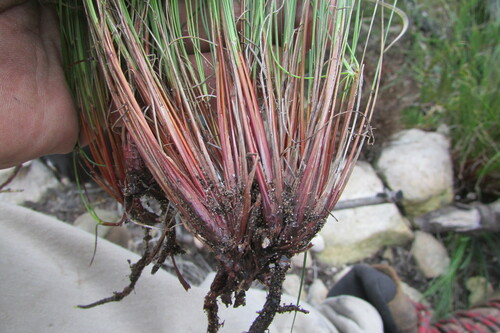
Flat culm bases

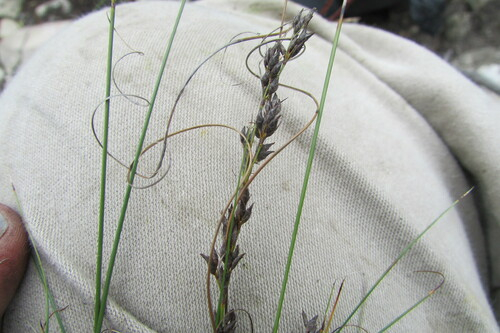
Flowering head

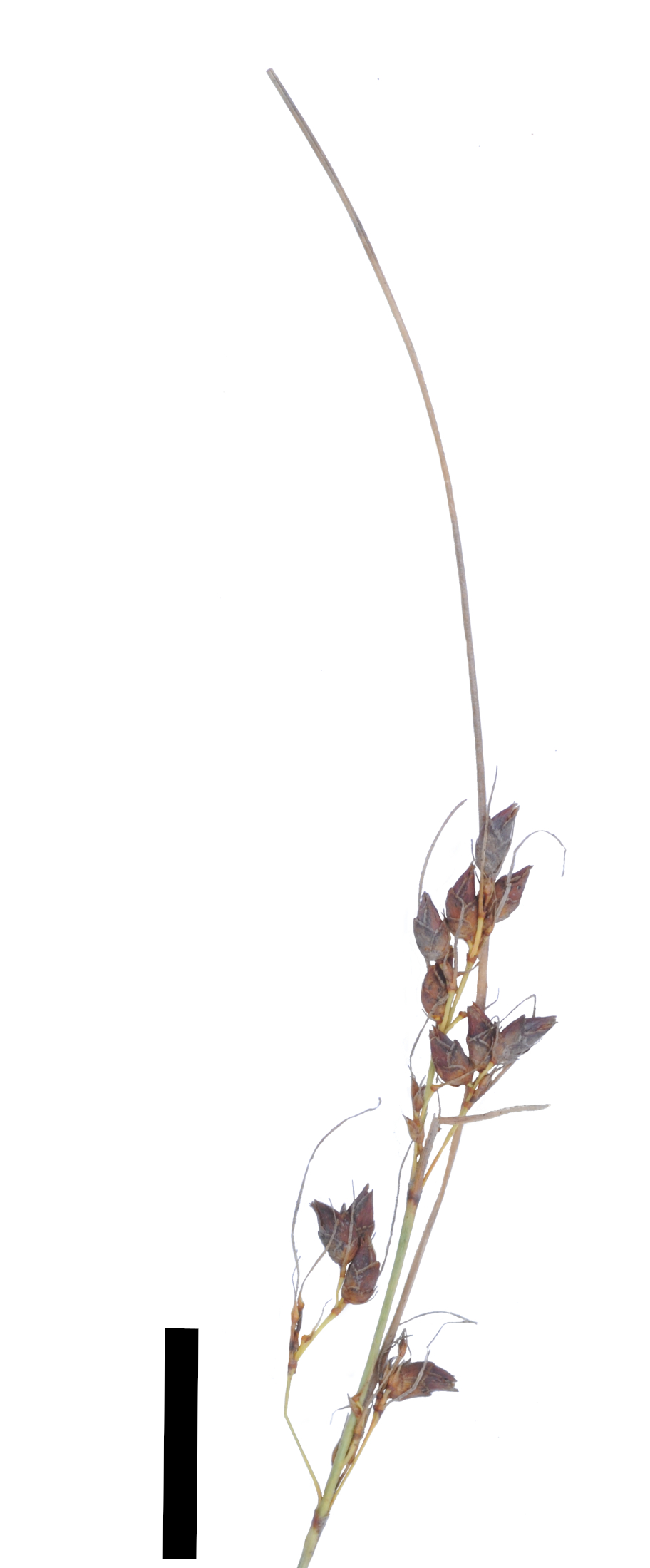
Flowering head
(black scale bar represents 10 mm)

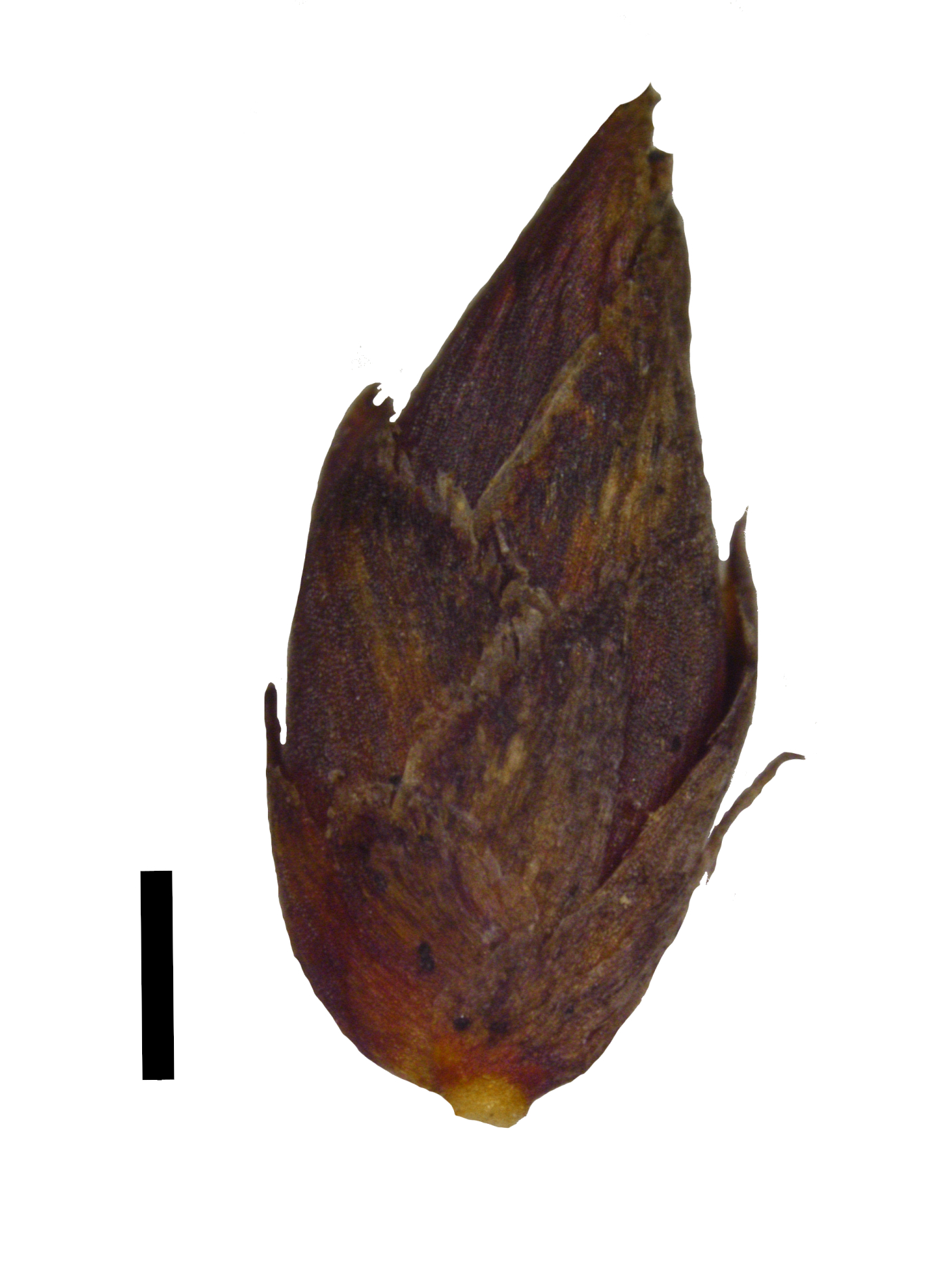
Spikelet
(black scale bar represents 1 mm)

== Taxonomy ==
Schoenus calceolus is a species in family Cyperaceae, tribe Schoeneae. Other genera in tribe Schoeneae include Lepidosperma, Oreobolus, Costularia, Tetraria and Gahnia. The most closely related species to S. calceolus are other southern African Schoenus species, specifically, species in the S. cuspidatus and allies group growing close nearby.

Southern African Schoenus were once classified as Tetraria; however, based on molecular and morphological differences, the two groups are evolutionary distinct. To ensure that this group of sedges is monophyletic (i.e. the genus only has closely related species), several species of Epischoenus and the southern African Tetraria were transferred into Schoenus. In the field, the southern African Schoenus can be distinguished from Tetraria species by their lack of stem leaves and the absence of reticulate sheaths at the bases of the flowering stems.

== Distribution and habitat ==
Schoenus calceolus is a species from the Agulhas Plain region of South Africa. It is primarily a species of limestone-derived soils, growing at elevations below 150 m.

== Images ==
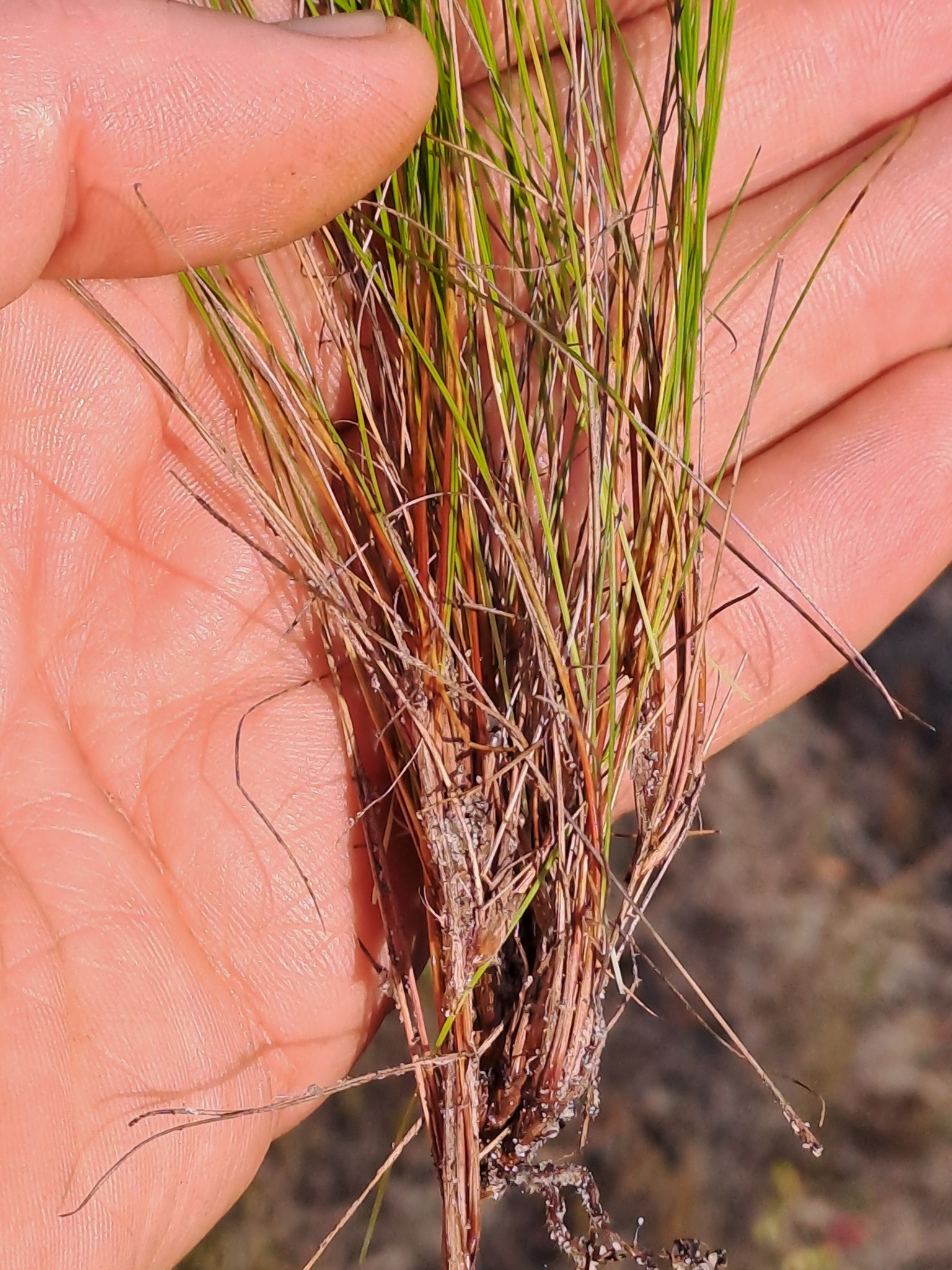
Flat culm bases

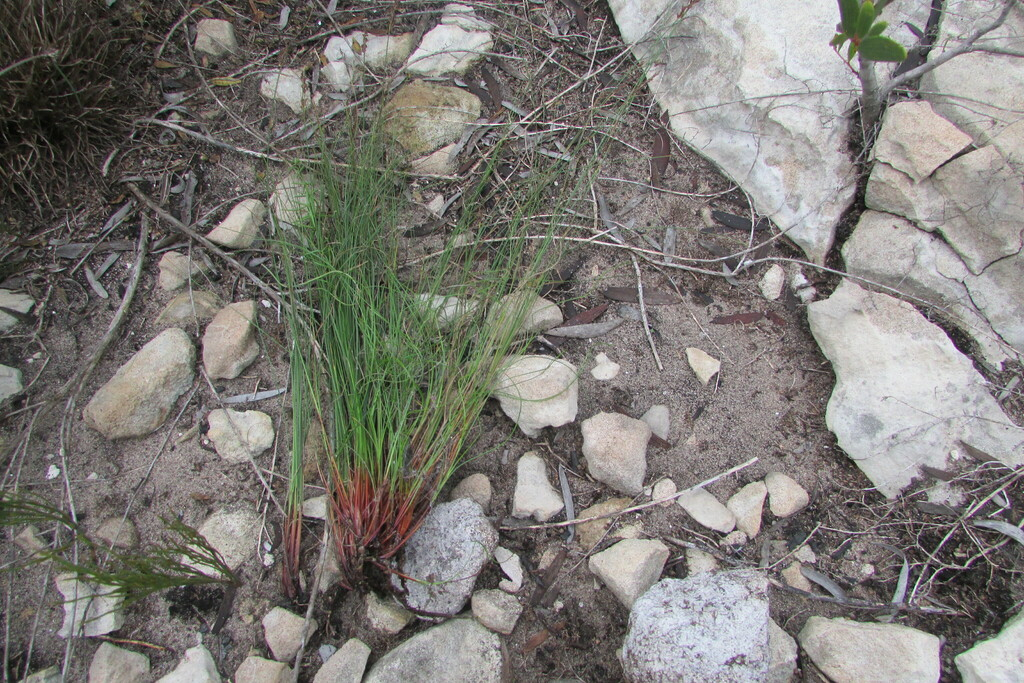
Flat culm bases

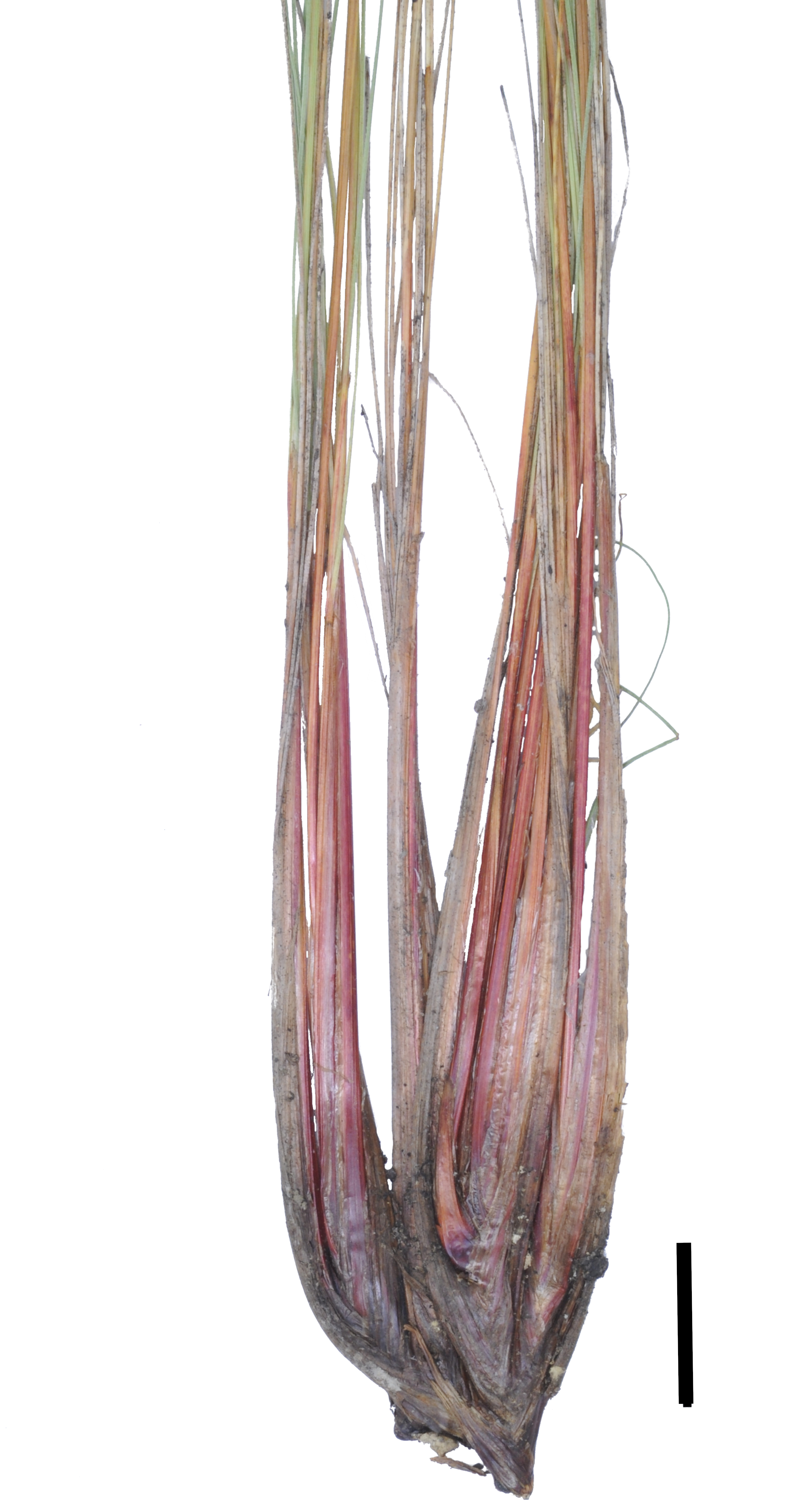
Flat culm bases

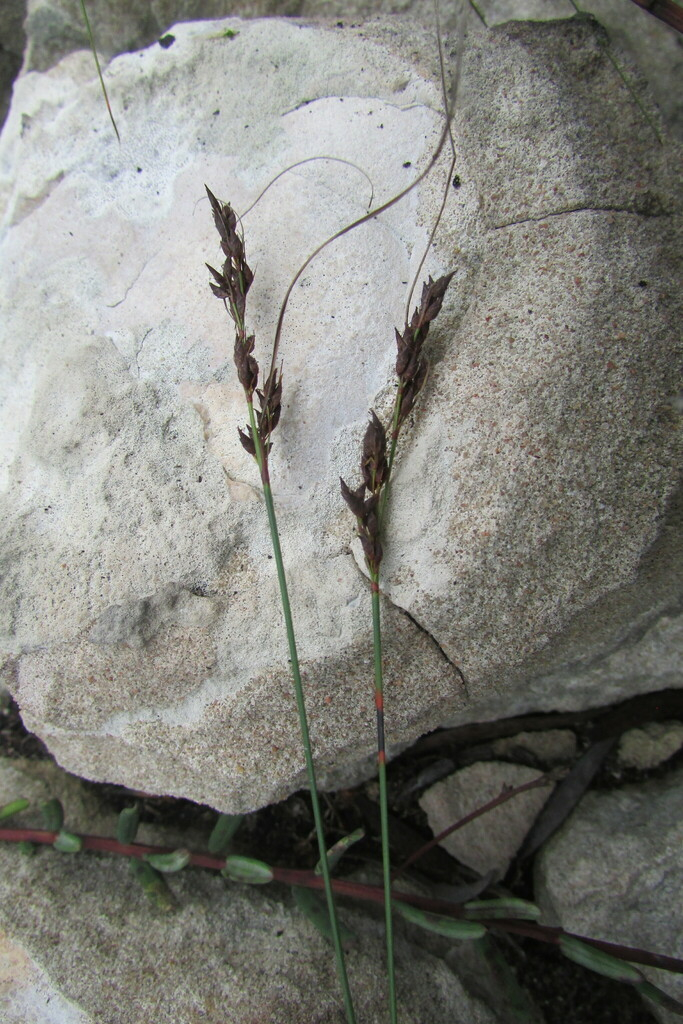
Flowering heads

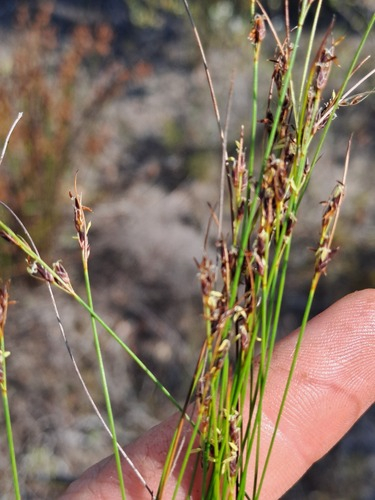
Flowering heads
