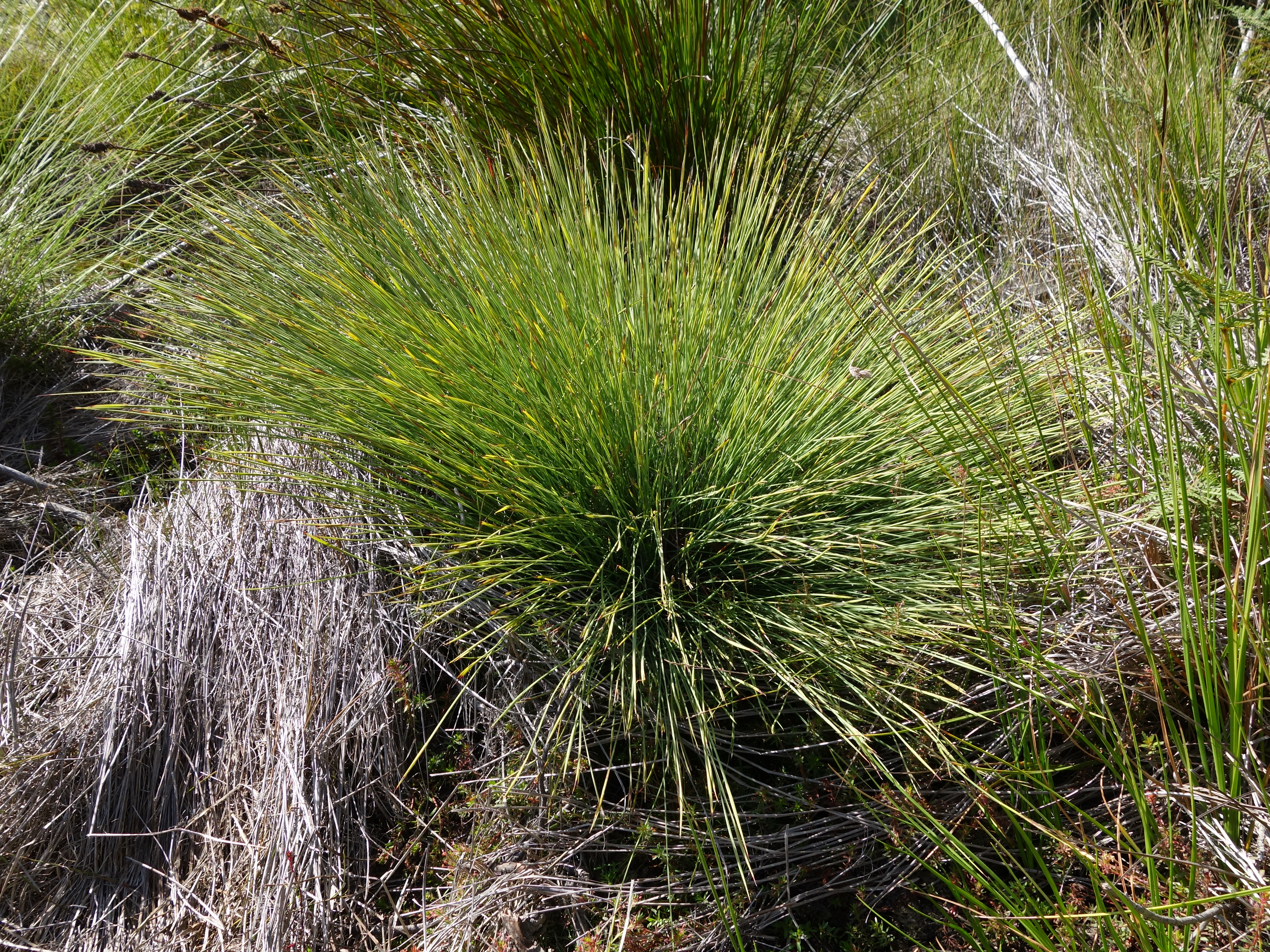
- Square veldrush

Scientific classification
- Kingdom: Plantae
- Clade: Tracheophytes
- Clade: Angiosperms
- Clade: Monocots
- Clade: Commelinids
- Order: Poales
- Family: Cyperaceae
- Genus: Schoenus
- Species: S. quadrangularis

Binomial name
- Schoenus quadrangularis Boeckeler
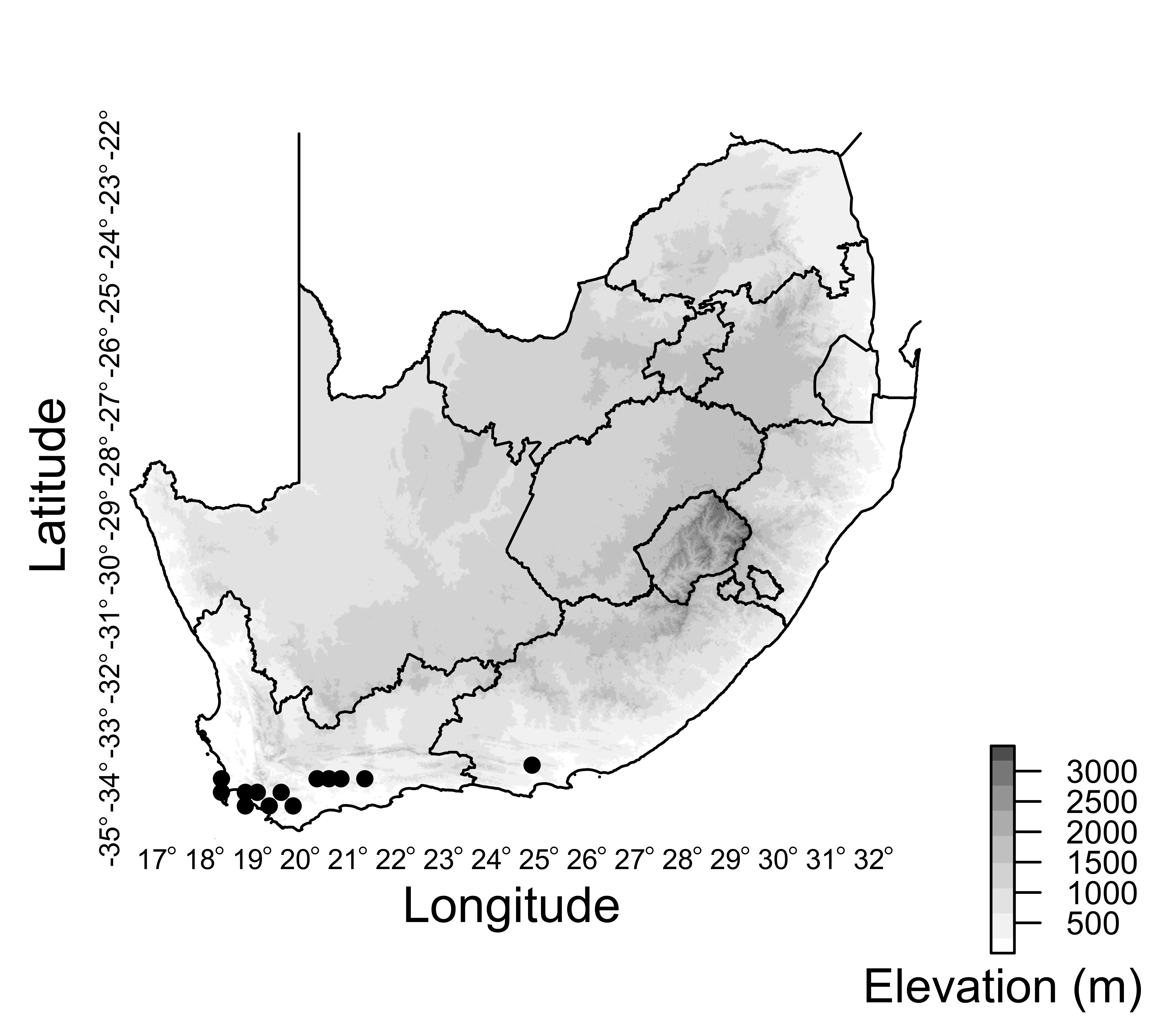
- Documented collection localities in South Africa

Synonyms
- Epischoenus quadrangularis (Boeckeler) C.B.Clarke; Tetraria quadrangularis (Boeckeler) Kük.

= Schoenus quadrangularis =

Species of grass-like plant

Schoenus quadrangularis is a species of sedge endemic to mountainous of southern South Africa.

== Description ==
Schoenus quadrangularis is a unique species amongst the southern African Schoenus that has deeply ridged, quadrangular (4-angled) stems directly below the flowering heads (inflorescences). Plants of this species often are bluish-tinged in colour.

Preliminary evidence suggests that the southern African Schoenus have a tendency to form hybrids with each other, which partially explains why they can be difficult to identify. However, it is not certain at this point whether S. quadrangularis forms hybrids with other southern African Schoenus species.

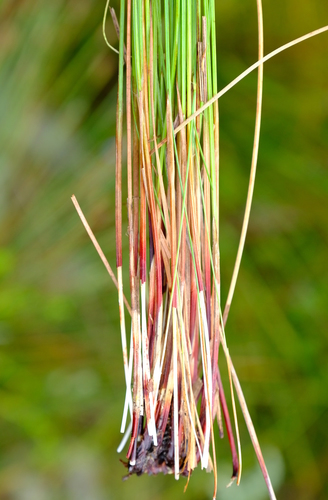
Bases of flowering stems (culms)

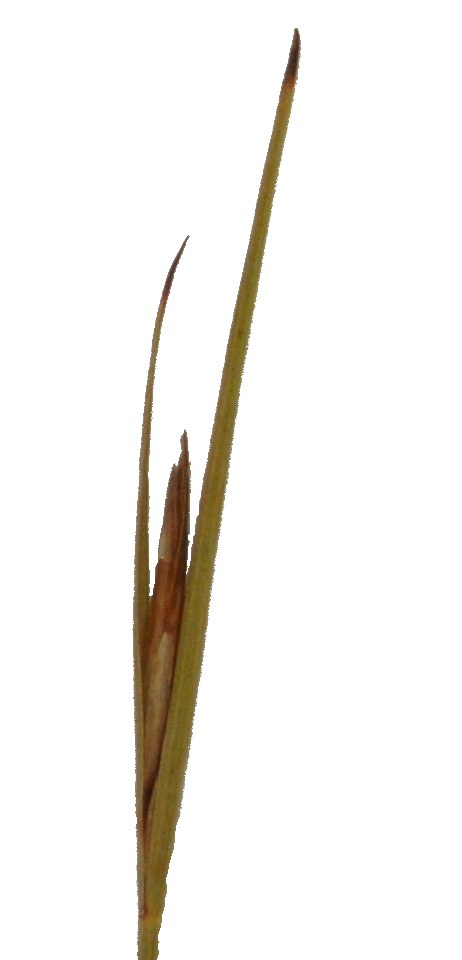
Flowering head

Spikelet

Nutlet (black scale bar is 1mm)

== Taxonomy ==
Schoenus quadrangularis is a species in family Cyperaceae, tribe Schoeneae, a clade that includes other notable genera such as Costularia, Gahnia, Lepidosperma, Oreobolus and Tetraria. The most closely related species to Schoenus quadrangularis are other species in the Epischoenus group of southern African Schoenus.

The genus Tetraria once included species from the southern African Schoenus; however, both molecular and morphological evidence suggests that the two genera are evolutionary distinct. To ensure that this group of sedges is monophyletic (i.e. the genus only has closely related species), several species of Epischoenus and the southern African Tetraria were transferred into Schoenus. In the field, the southern African Schoenus can be distinguished from Tetraria species by their lack of stem leaves and the absence of reticulate sheaths at the bases of the flowering stems.

== Distribution and habitat ==
The distribution of Schoenus quadrangularis ranges from the Cape Peninsula in the west to the Groot Winterhook Mountains in the Eastern Cape Province of southern South Africa. This species has been mostly observed growing in damp sites in the mountains, with elevations ranging from 82-1370 m.

== Gallery ==
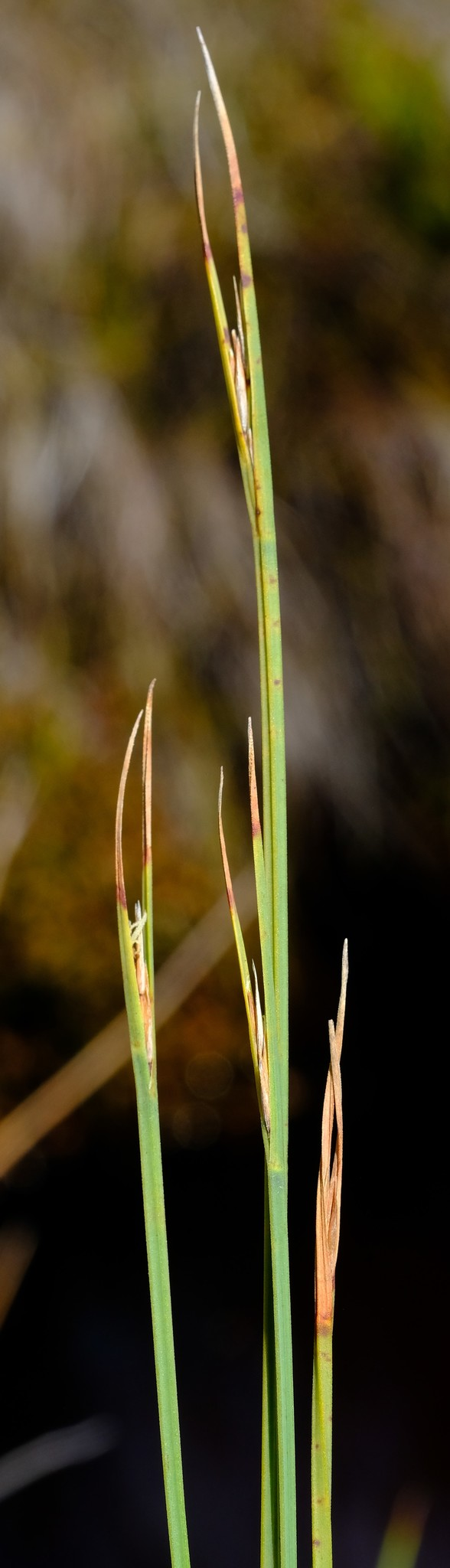
Flowering heads (inflorescences)

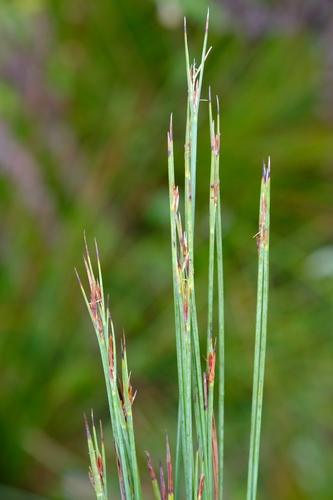
Flowering heads (inflorescences)
