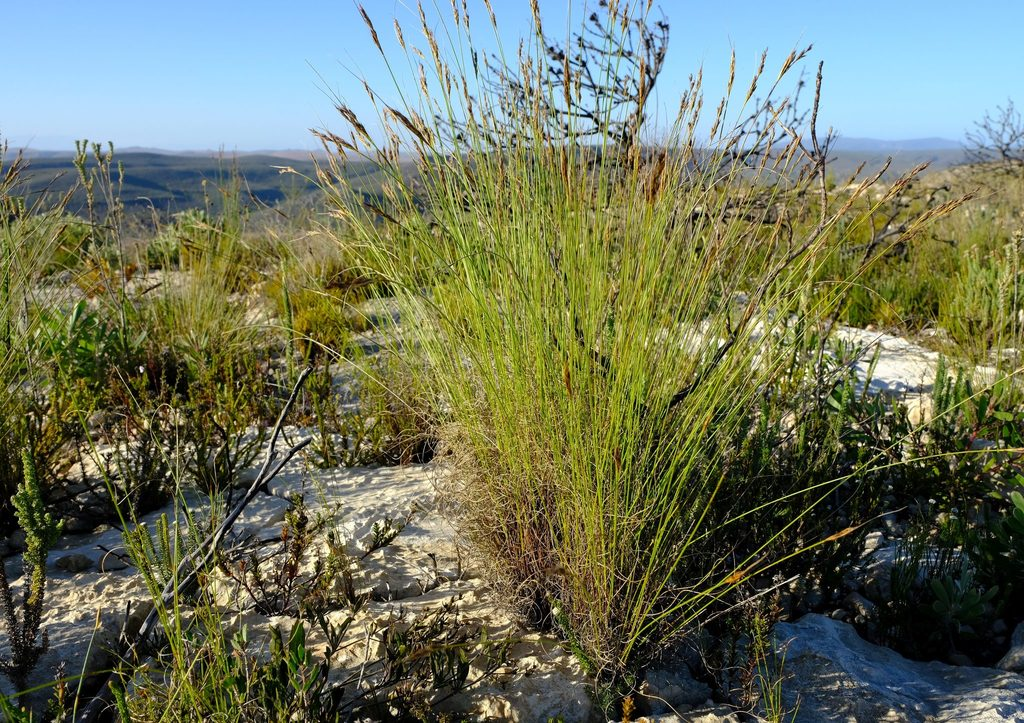
- Bract veldrush

Scientific classification
- Kingdom: Plantae
- Clade: Tracheophytes
- Clade: Angiosperms
- Clade: Monocots
- Clade: Commelinids
- Order: Poales
- Family: Cyperaceae
- Genus: Schoenus
- Species: S. prophyllus

Binomial name
- Schoenus prophyllus T.L.Elliott & Muasya
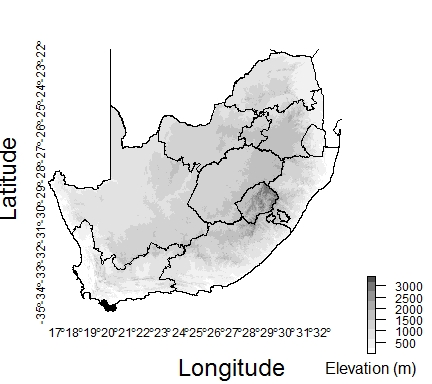
- Documented collection localities

= Schoenus prophyllus =

Species of grass-like plant

Schoenus prophyllus is a species of flowering plant in the sedge family. It is endemic to the Agulhas Plain region of Western Cape Province of South Africa.

== Description ==
The key diagnostic character of S. prophyllus is its well-developed, firm, shiny spikelet prophylls with relatively long mucros compared to other species in the Schoenus cuspidatus group.

Other species in the S. cuspidatus group that are similar to S. prophyllus are Schoenus bolusii, Schoenus calceolus, Schoenus purpurascens, and Schoenus submarginalis, which are all species with relatively short spikelets less than 4.0 mm. However, the spikelets of S. prophyllus are ovate in shape, compared to the lancoelate spikelets of S. bolusii and S. submarginalis. Furthermore, the spikelets of S. prophyllus do not have the conspicuous reddish-purple streaking patterns adjacent to the glume margins that are found in S. bolusii and S. submarginalis.

Schoenus calceolus often grows in close proximity, but its flattened culm base and straight leaves differ from those of S. prophyllus, whose leaves curl with age.

Similar to other sedges, plants in this group are very difficult to identify. It appears that part of this problem is caused by the tendency of the southern African Schoenus to form hybrids with each other. It is not clear whether Schoenus prophyllus forms hybrids with other southern African Schoenus species.

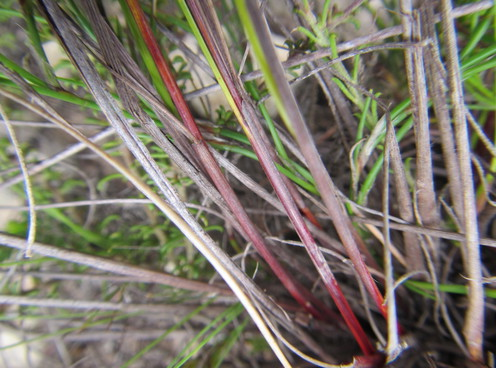
Bases of flowering stems (culms)

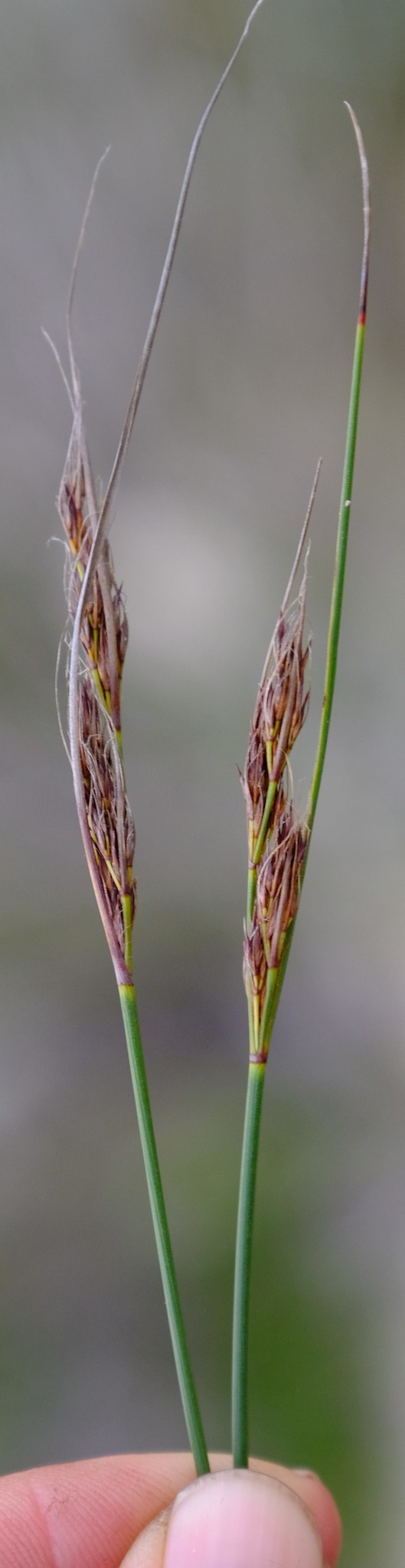
Flowering heads (inflorescences)

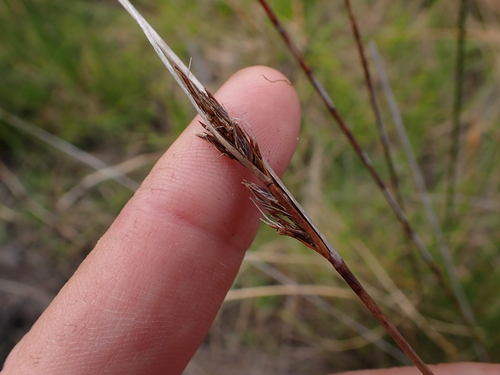
Flowering head

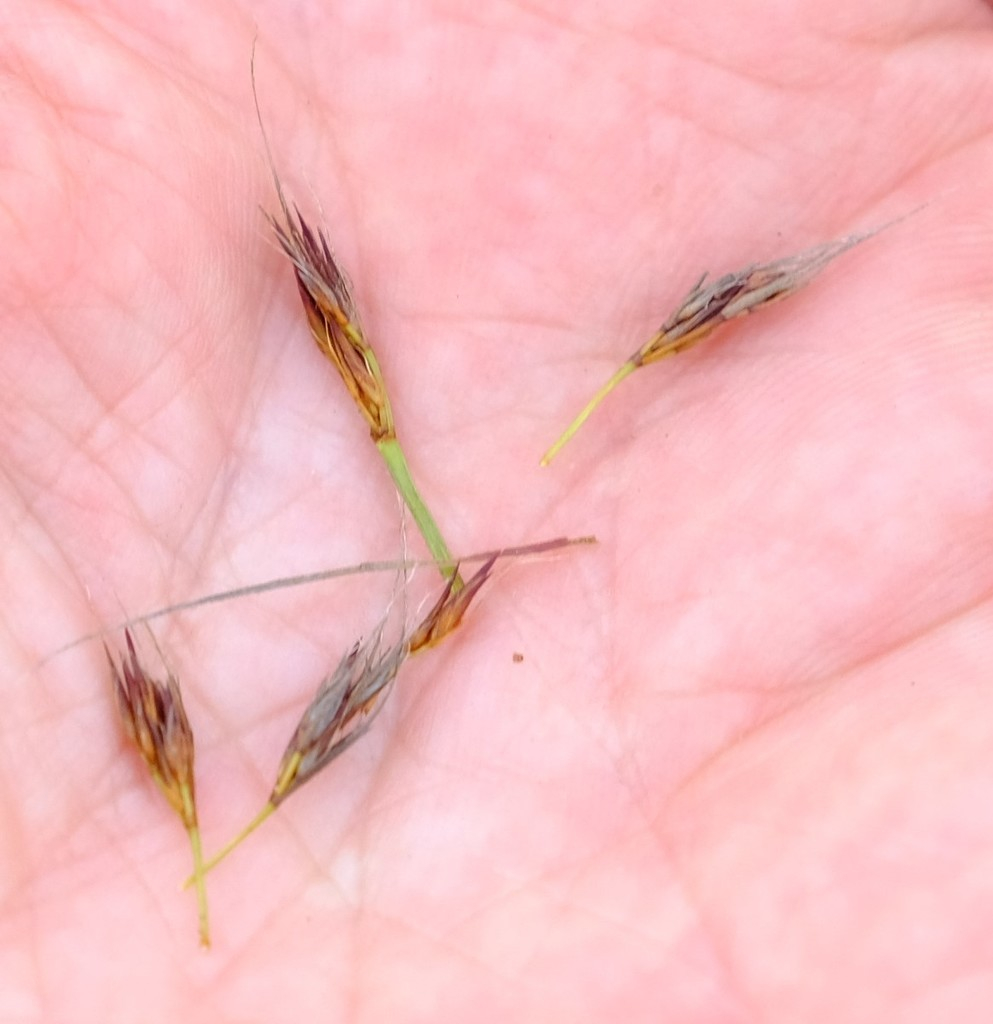
Flowering spikes

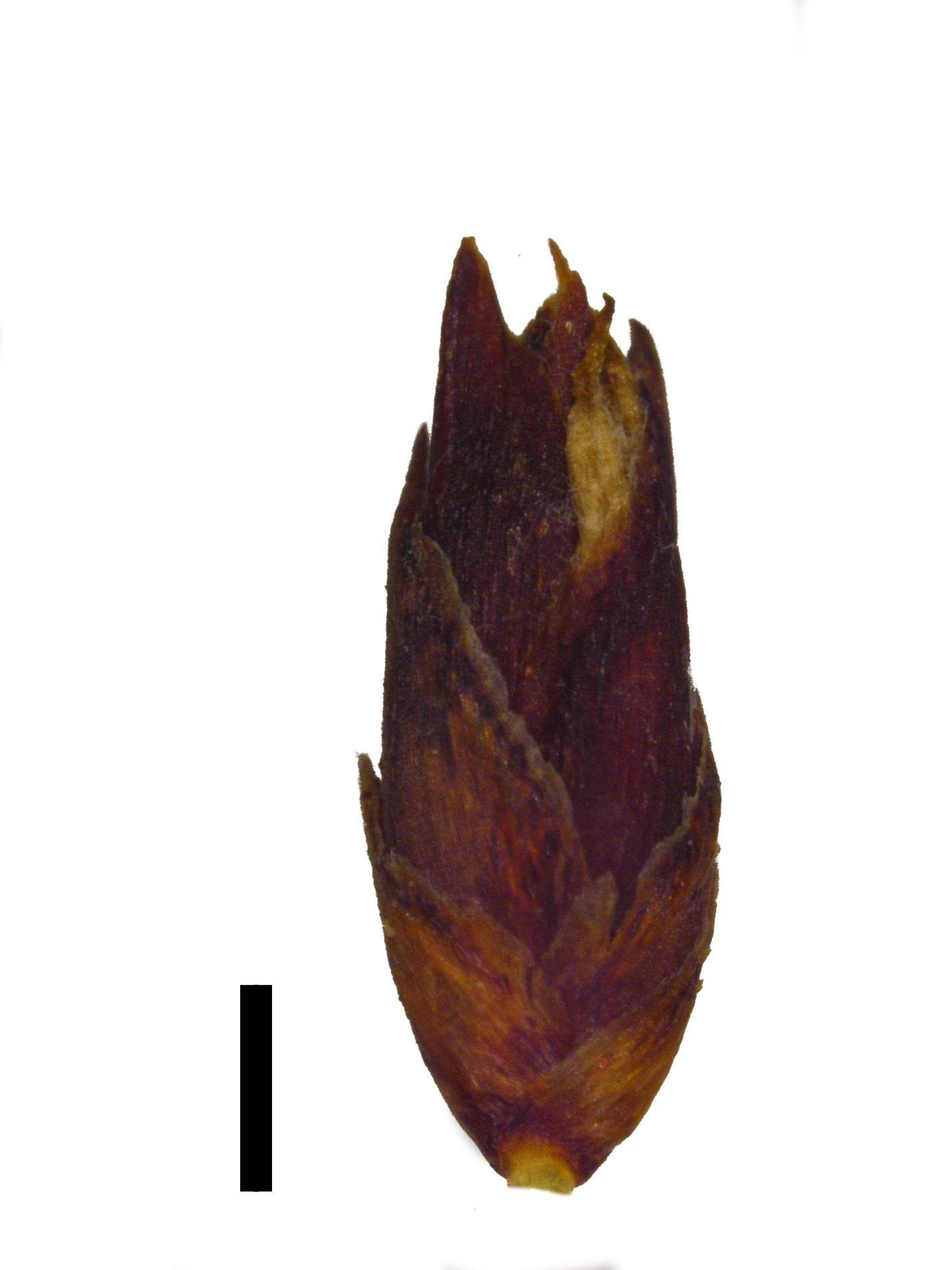
Spikelet
(black scale bar represents 1 mm)

== Taxonomy ==
Schoenus prophyllus is a species in family Cyperaceae, tribe Schoeneae. Other genera in tribe Schoeneae include Lepidosperma, Oreobolus, Costularia, Tetraria and Gahnia. The most closely related species to S. prophyllus are other southern African Schoenus species, specifically, species in the S. cuspidatus and allies group growing in close geographic proximity.

Southern African Schoenus were once classified as Tetraria; however, based on molecular and morphological differences, the two groups are evolutionary distinct. To ensure that this group of sedges is monophyletic (i.e. the genus only has closely related species), several species of Epischoenus and the southern African Tetraria were transferred into Schoenus. In the field, the southern African Schoenus can be distinguished from Tetraria species by their lack of stem leaves and the absence of reticulate sheaths at the bases of the flowering stems.

== Distribution and habitat ==
Schoenus prophyllus is found in the southern Agulhas Plain region of South Africa. The preferred growing substrate of this species is limestone. It grows at elevations less than 200 m.

== Gallery ==
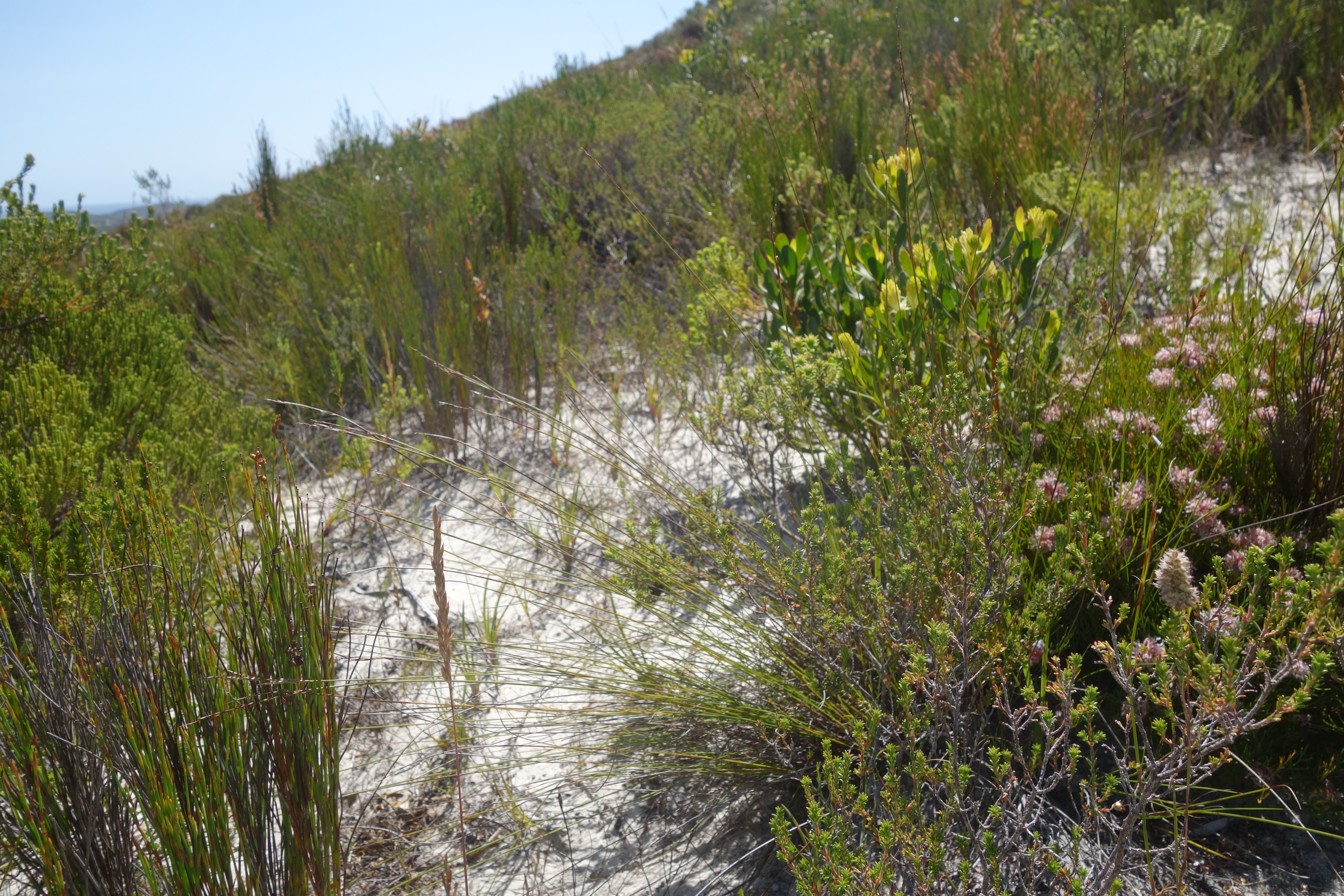
Growth form

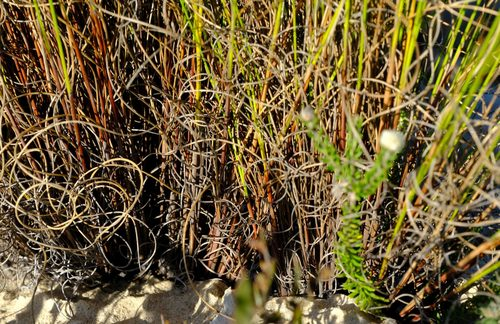
Bases of flowering stems

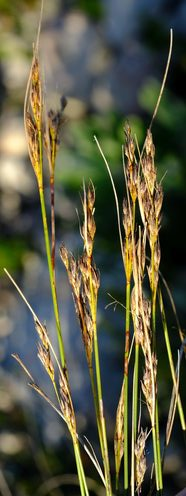
Flowering heads

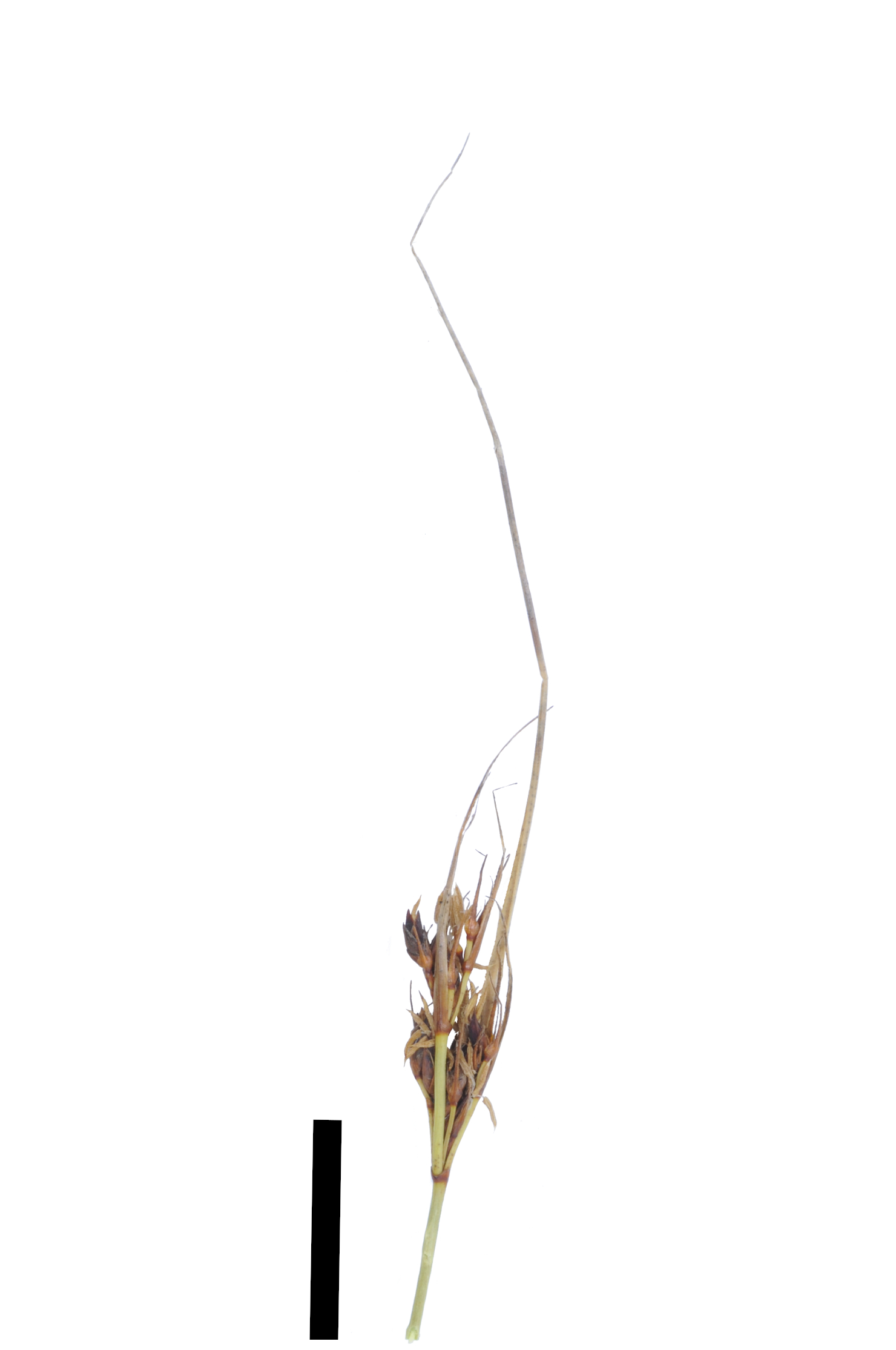
Flowering head
(black scale bar represents 10 mm)

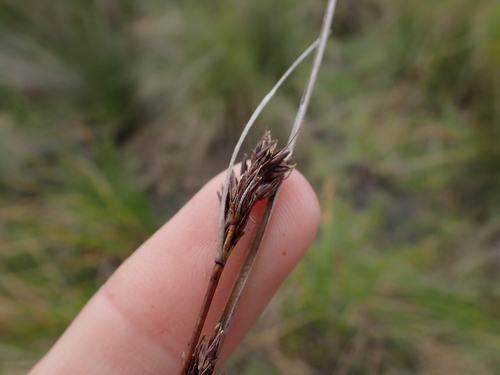
Flowering head

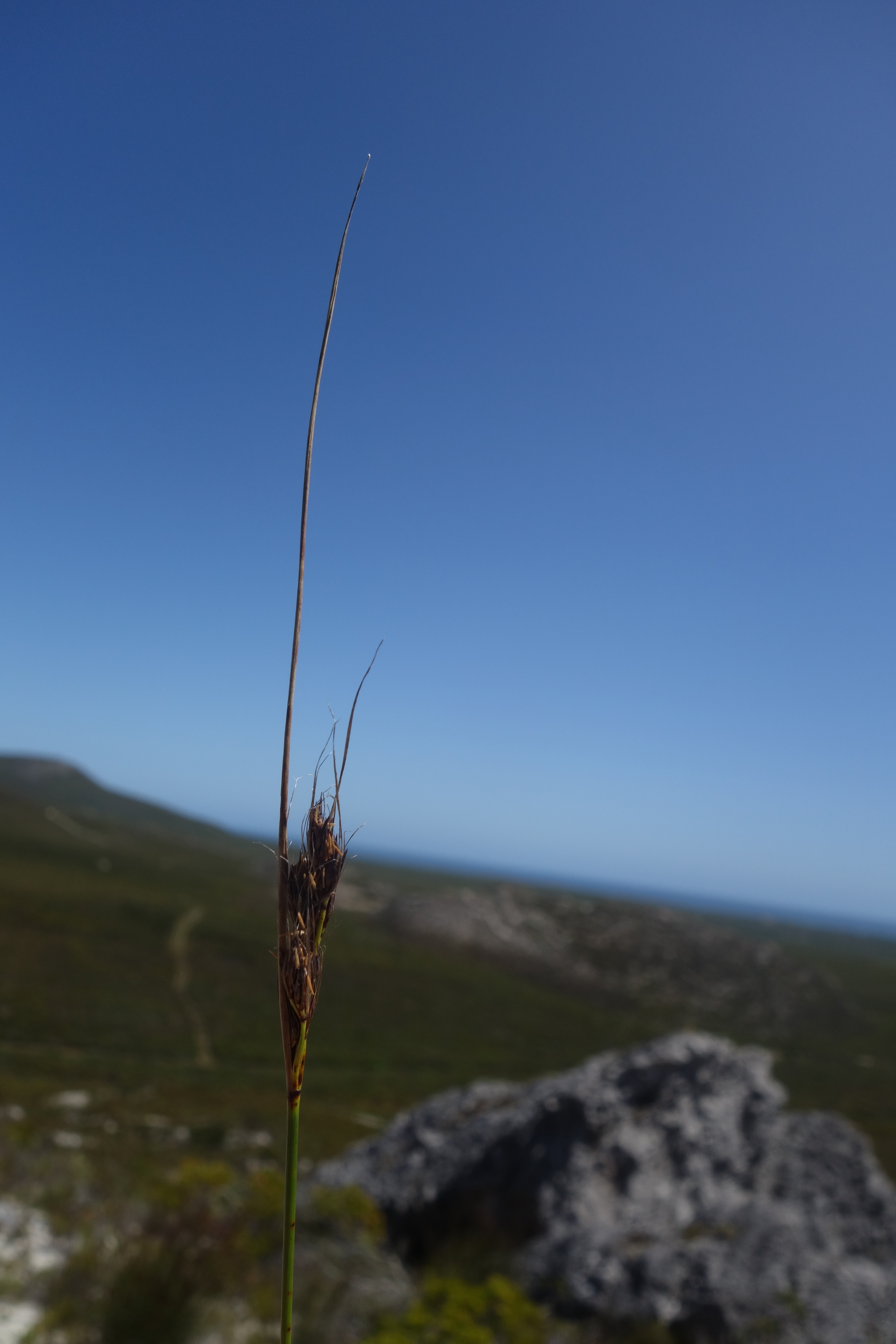
Flowering head

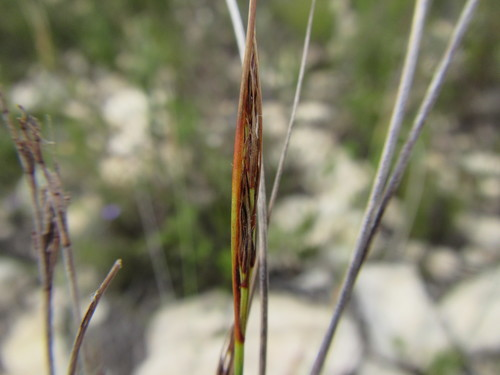
Flowering head
