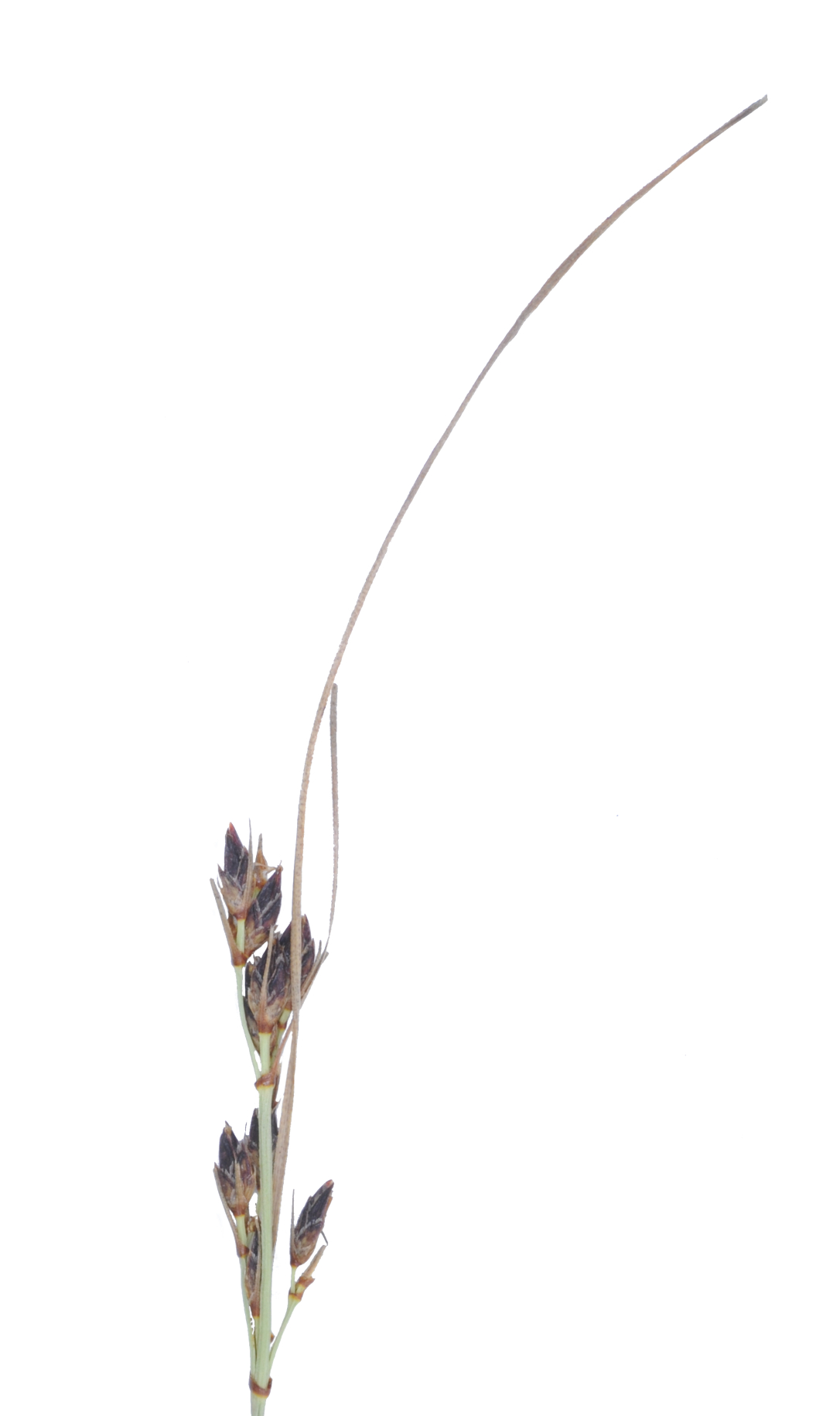
- Purple veldrush

Scientific classification
- Kingdom: Plantae
- Clade: Tracheophytes
- Clade: Angiosperms
- Clade: Monocots
- Clade: Commelinids
- Order: Poales
- Family: Cyperaceae
- Genus: Schoenus
- Species: S. purpurascens

Binomial name
- Schoenus purpurascens T.L.Elliott & Muasya

= Schoenus purpurascens =

Species of grass-like plant

Schoenus purpurascens is a species of sedge endemic to the mountains of the southwestern part of the Western Cape Province of South Africa, with its distribution centered around the Caledon area.

== Description ==
The loose membranaceous sheath, often with reddish-purple spots or streaks, of S. purpurascens are a key diagnostic character. Schoenus purpurascens also has non-channelled leaf blades that often appear flat and ovate spikelets with relatively short mucros. The ovate spikelets are usually less than 4.1 mm in length.

A similar species to S. purpurascens that overlaps in its distributional area is Schoenus bolusii. These two species both have membranaceous leaf sheaths with reddish-purple streaks or spots; however, as the leaf blades of S. bolusii are channelled and terete, those of S. purpurascens appear flat because they are usually not channelled. The spikelets of the two species also differ, with S. bolusii having thinner spikelets that are lanceolate to ovate in form, while those of S. purpurascens are ovate.

Two species that also have ovate spikelets are Schoenus prophyllus and Schoenus calceolus, but these two species have channelled leaves compared to the non-channelled leaves of S. purpurascens.

Similar to other sedges, plants in this group are very difficult to identify. It appears that part of this problem is caused by the tendency of the southern African Schoenus to form hybrids with each other. It is not clear whether Schoenus purpurascens forms hybrids with other southern African Schoenus species.

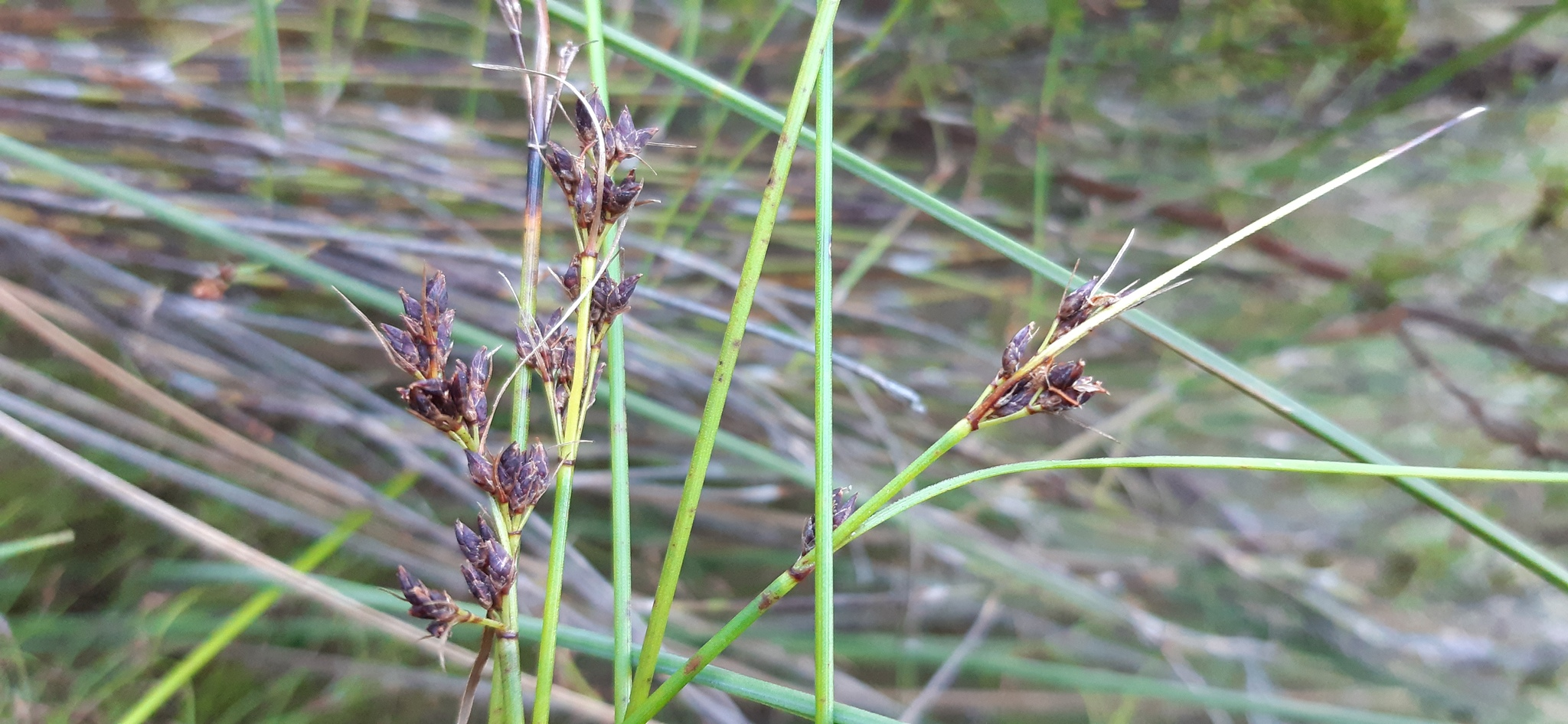
Flowering heads

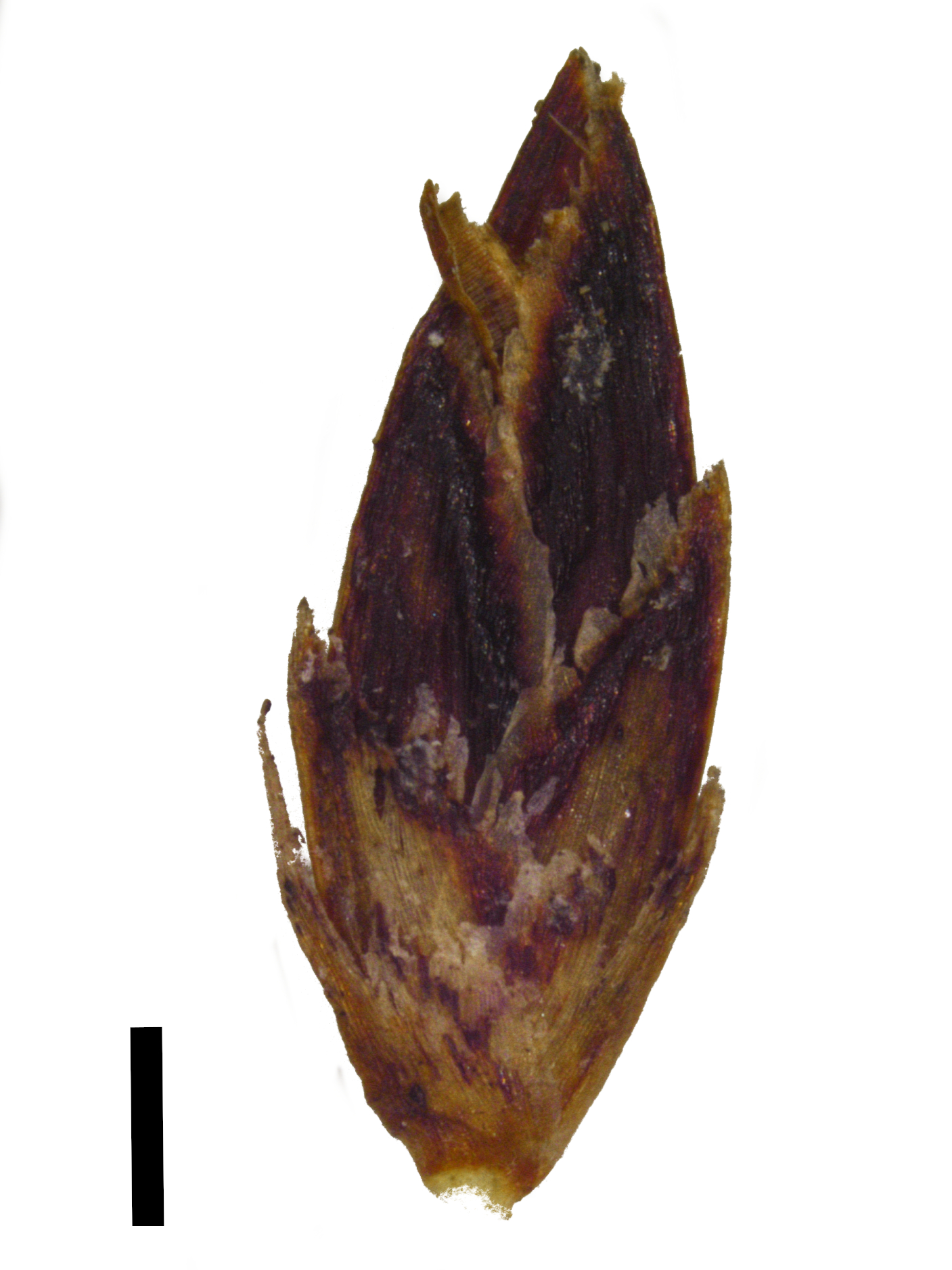
Spikelet (black scale bar represents 1 mm)

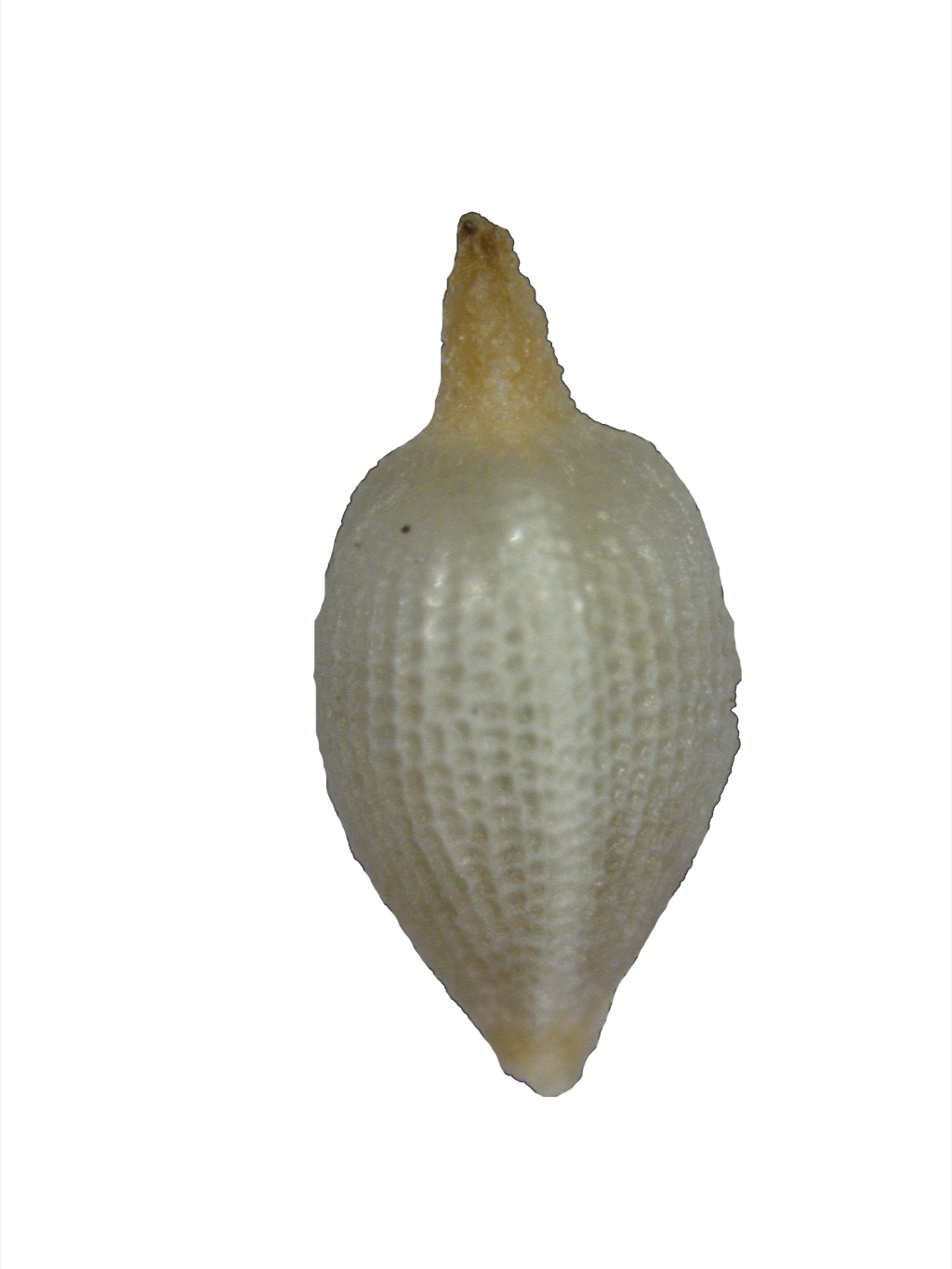
Nutlet

== Taxonomy ==
Schoenus purpurascens is a species in family Cyperaceae, tribe Schoeneae. Other notable genera in tribe Schoeneae include Lepidosperma, Oreobolus, Costularia, Tetraria and Gahnia. The most closely related species to S. purpurascens are other southern African Schoenus species, specifically, species in the S. cuspidatus and allies group.

Southern African Schoenus were once classified as Tetraria; however, based on molecular and morphological differences, we now know that the two groups are evolutionary distinct. To ensure that this group of sedges is monophyletic (i.e. the genus only has closely related species), several species of Epischoenus and the southern African Tetraria were transferred into Schoenus. In the field, the southern African Schoenus can be distinguished from Tetraria species by their lack of stem leaves and the absence of reticulate sheaths at the bases of the flowering stems.

== Distribution and habitat ==
Schoenus purpurascens has a relatively narrow distribution, centered on the Caledon region of the southwestern part of the Western Cape Province of South Africa. This species usually grows on moist to well-drained mountain slopes, ranging from 275 to over 1000 m in elevation.
