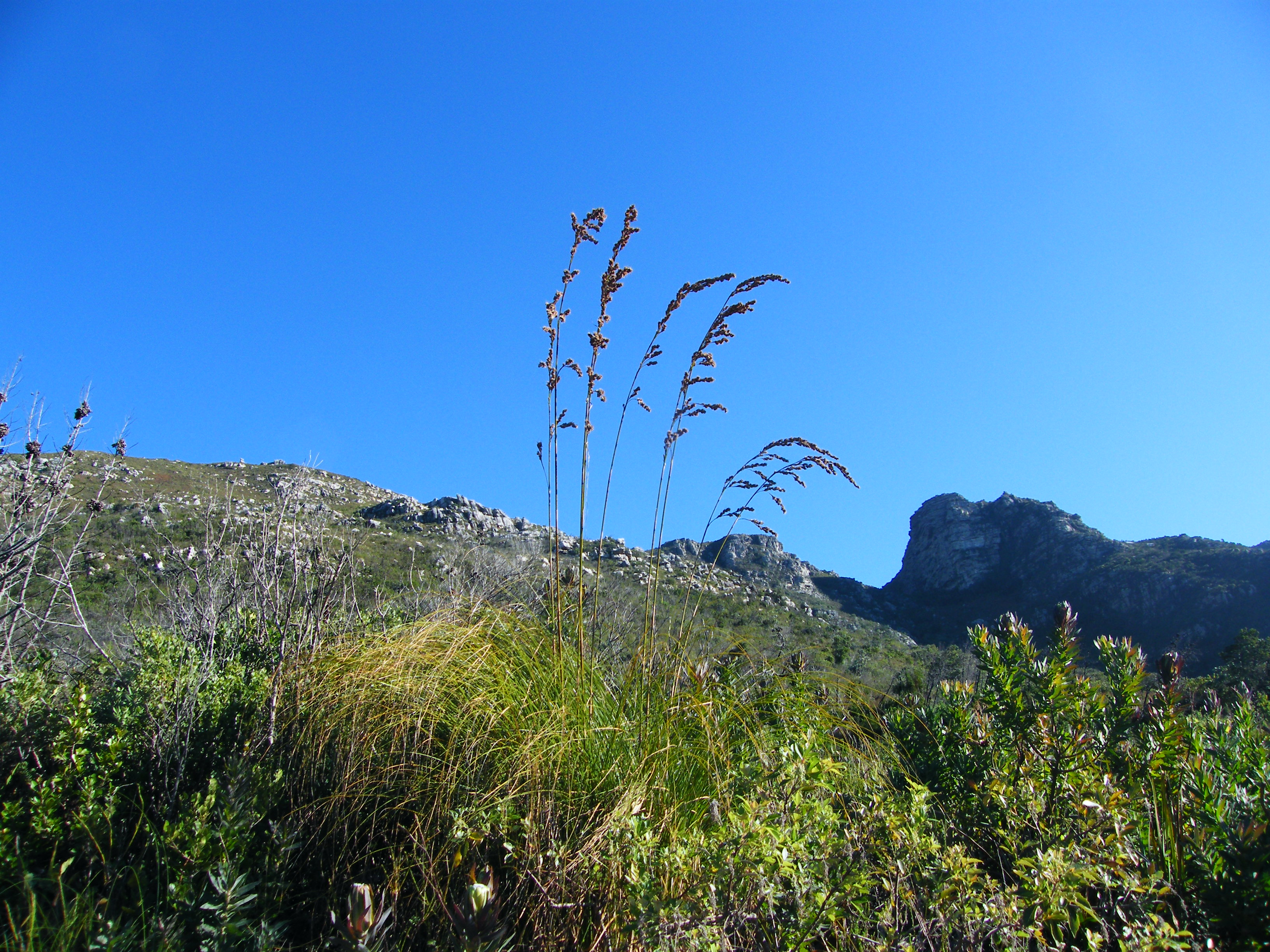
- Tetraria bromoides

Scientific classification
- Kingdom: Plantae
- Clade: Tracheophytes
- Clade: Angiosperms
- Clade: Monocots
- Clade: Commelinids
- Order: Poales
- Family: Cyperaceae
- Genus: Tetraria
- Species: T. bromoides

Binomial name
- Tetraria bromoides H.Pfeiff.

Synonyms
- Lepidosperma brehmeri Boeckeler; Lepidosperma rottboellii Schrad.; Schoenus bromoides Lam.; Schoenus rottboellii (Schrad.) Kuntze; Sclerochaetium angustifolium Hochst.; Sclerochaetium koenigii Nees ex Hochst.; Sclerochaetium rottboellii (Schrad.) Nees; Tetraria angustifolia (Hochst.) H.Pfeiff.; Tetraria rottboellii (Schrad.) C.B.Clarke; Tetraria rottboellioides C.B.Clarke

= Tetraria bromoides =

Species of grass-like plant

Tetraria bromoides is a species of flowering plant in the sedge family, which is native to the Cape Provinces in Southern Africa.

== Taxonomy ==
Tetraria bromoides was first described as Schoenus bromoides by Lamarck in 1791. In 1927, this was revised to Tetraria bromoides by Hans Pfeiffer.
