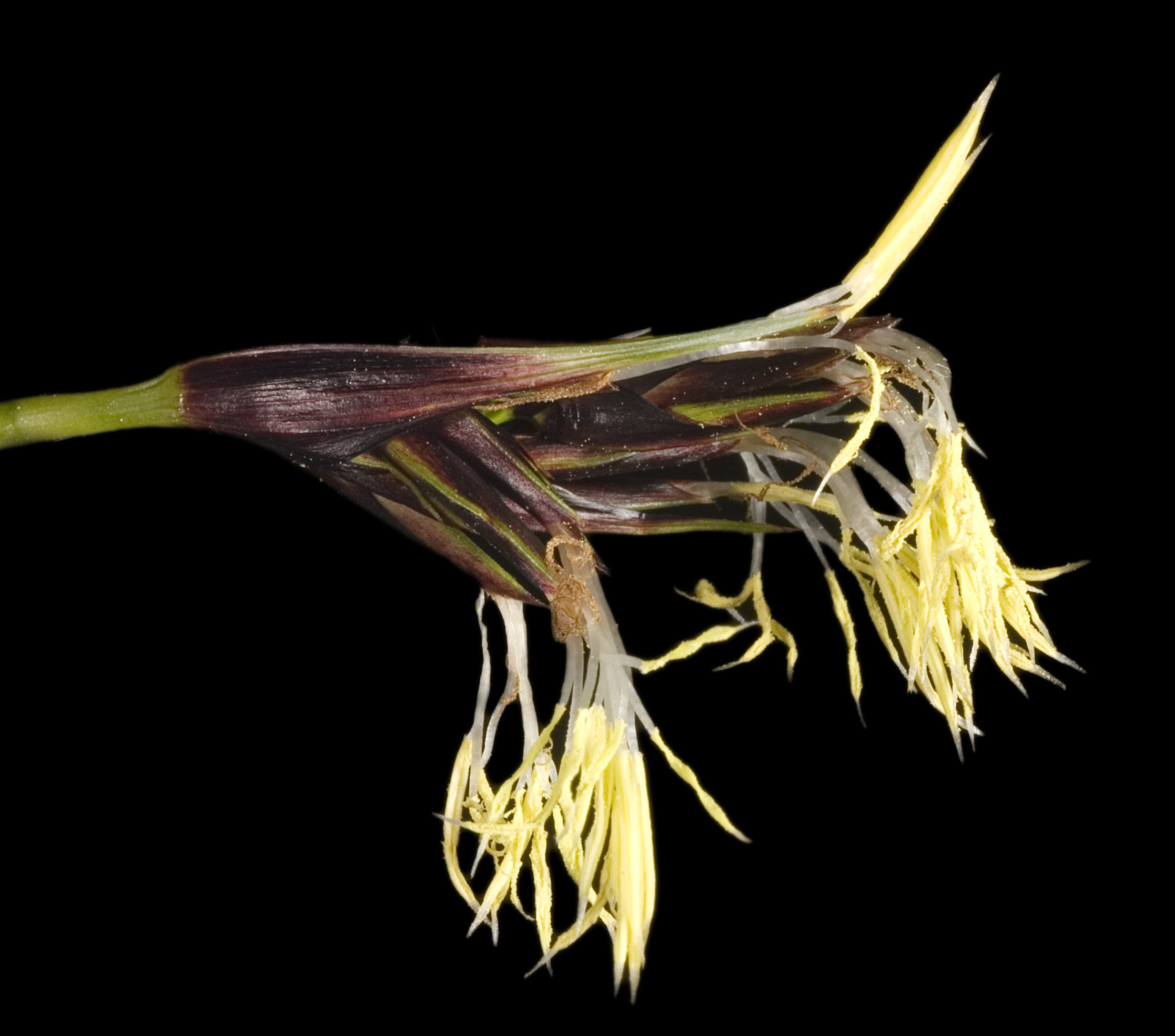
- Morelotia octandra male flowers
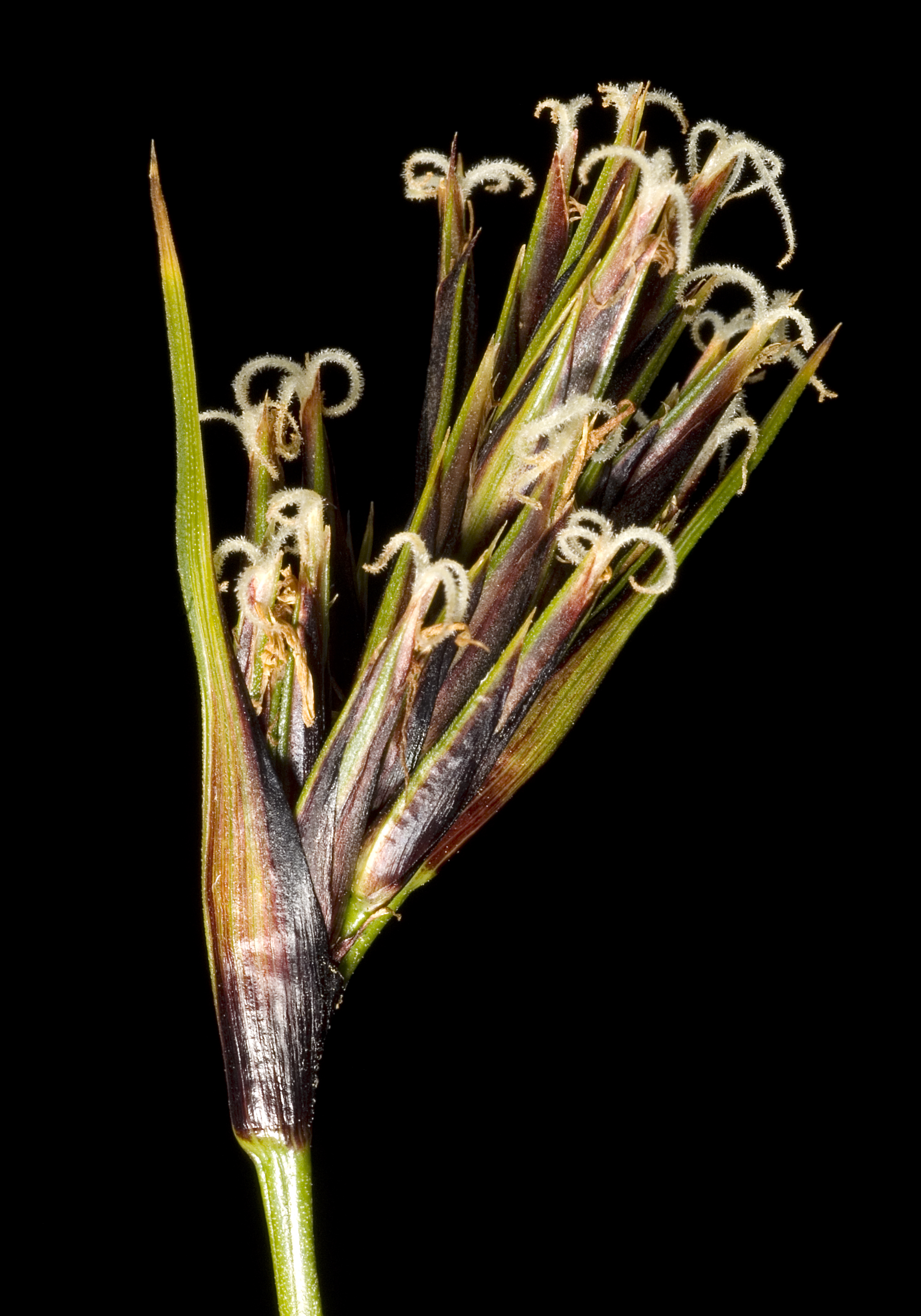
- Morelotia octandra female flowers

Scientific classification
- Kingdom: Plantae
- Clade: Tracheophytes
- Clade: Angiosperms
- Clade: Monocots
- Clade: Commelinids
- Order: Poales
- Family: Cyperaceae
- Genus: Morelotia
- Species: M. octandra

Binomial name
- Morelotia octandra (Nees) R.L.Barrett & J.J.Bruhl (2021)
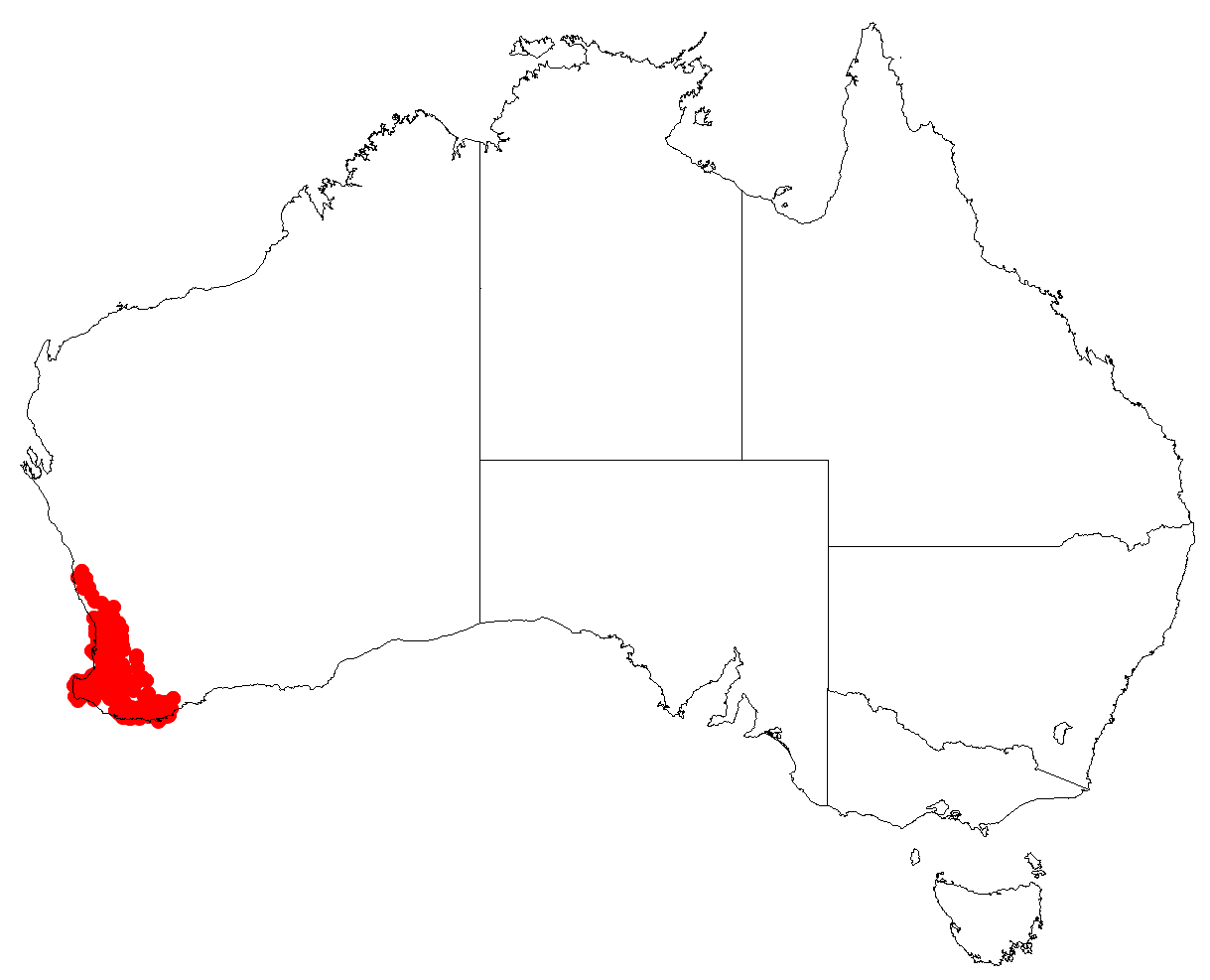
- Collections data from AVH

Synonyms
- Elynanthus octandrus Nees (1840); Elynanthus revolutus Nees (1844); Schoenus octandrus (Nees) F.Muell. (1875); Tetraria octandra (Nees) Kük. (1931); Tetrariopsis octandra (Nees) C.B.Clarke (1908)

= Morelotia octandra =

Species of sedge

Morelotia octandra is a species of sedge native to the south-west of Western Australia.

== Description ==
Morelotia octandra is a rhizomatous, tufted perennial, sedge which grows from 0.175 to 1.25 m high. Its brown to black flowers may be seen from May to November. It grows on white, grey or lateritic sand, loam, granite, gravel and in swamps and on rocky hillsides.

== Distribution ==
It is found in the South-West Province of Beard's classification of ecological regions, or using the more recent IBRA region definitions, in Avon Wheatbelt, Esperance Plains, Geraldton Sandplains, Jarrah Forest, Swan Coastal Plain, and Warren bioregions.

== Taxonomy ==
This species was first described by Nees von Esenbeck in 1841 as Elynanthus octandrus. In 1931, Georg Kükenthal reassigned it to the genus, Tetraria. In 2021 R.L.Barrett & J.J.Bruhl reassigned it to genus Morelotia.
