= Costularia cadetii =

Scientific classification
- Kingdom: Plantae
- Clade: Tracheophytes
- Clade: Angiosperms
- Clade: Monocots
- Clade: Commelinids
- Order: Poales
- Family: Cyperaceae
- Genus: Costularia
- Species: C. cadetii

Binomial name
- Costularia cadetii Larridon 2019

Species of grass-like plant

Costularia cadetii is a perennial herb that grows near the rim of volcanoes in Réunion, which is located to the east of Madagascar in the Indian Ocean. It was discovered in 1965 but more evidence was required: it was named Costularia cadetii after its collector, Thérésian Cadet, in 2019. It is also an endangered species because of many factors such as volcanic eruptions, climate change, and fire.
