= Chamaedendron =

Scientific classification
- Kingdom: Plantae
- Clade: Tracheophytes
- Clade: Angiosperms
- Clade: Monocots
- Clade: Commelinids
- Order: Poales
- Family: Cyperaceae
- Genus: Chamaedendron (Kükenthal) Larridon

Genus of grass-like plants

Chamaedendron is a genus of flowering plants in the sedge family, Cyperaceae. They are endemic to New Caledonia, with 5 species formerly placed in Costularia. Its closest relatives are Costularia and Oreobolus.

== List of species ==
- Chamaedendron kukenthaliana Larridon
- Chamaedendron fragilis (Däniker) Larridon
- Chamaedendron neocaledonica (Rendle) Larridon
- Chamaedendron nervosa (J. Raynal) Larridon
- Chamaedendron xyridioides (Däniker) Larridon
