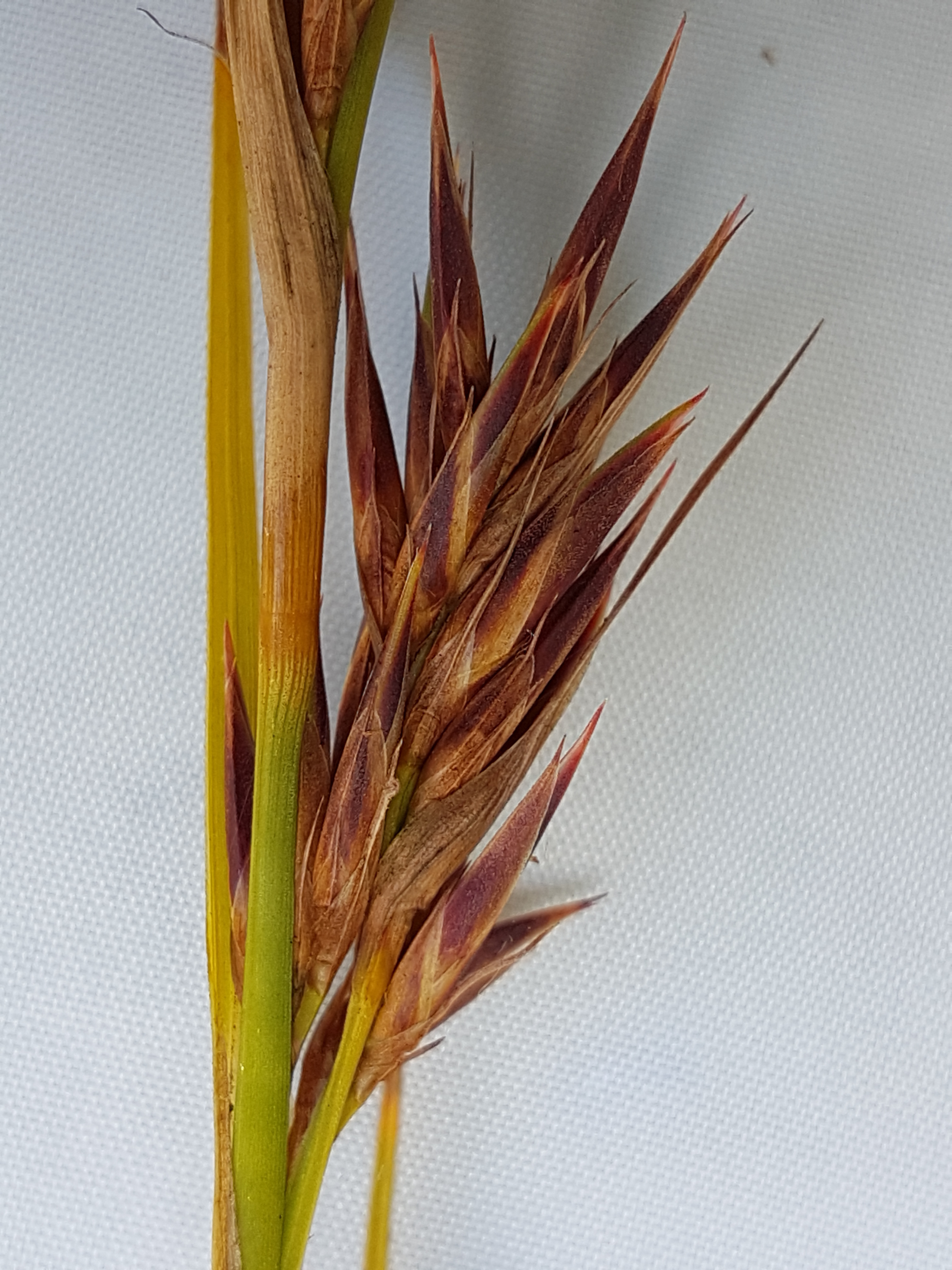

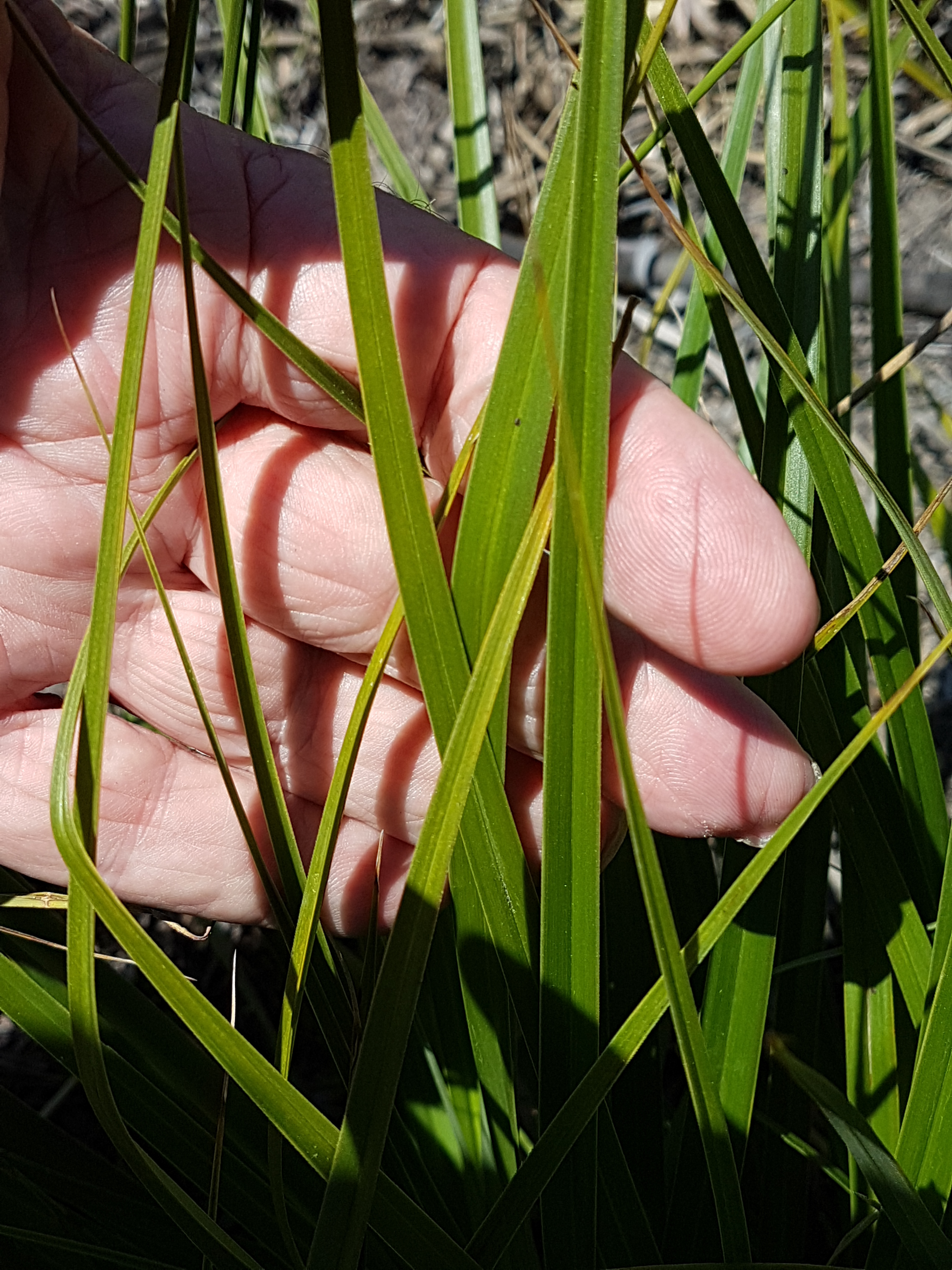

Scientific classification
- Kingdom: Plantae
- Clade: Tracheophytes
- Clade: Angiosperms
- Clade: Monocots
- Clade: Commelinids
- Order: Poales
- Family: Cyperaceae
- Genus: Tetraria
- Species: T. thermalis

Binomial name
- Tetraria thermalis (L.) C.B.Clarke

Synonyms
- Schoenus thermalis L.

= Tetraria thermalis =

Species of grass-like plant

Tetraria thermalis (L.) C.B.Clarke, the bergpalmiet, is a South African perennial in the family Cyperaceae. The species is endemic to the Western Cape, from the Cape Peninsula to Nature's Valley, growing on sandy soils and sandstone slopes There are some 50 species of Tetraria in Africa and Australasia, of which about 38 occur in the Cape fynbos. Tetraria, currently, is polyphyletic and in need of taxonomic revision.

This is a pioneer plant which recovers rapidly after fire, aiding the regrowth of other species. It reaches some 2,5 m in height, is trigonous with wiry, drooping yellow-green leaves that are narrowly sword-shaped and keeled. They have scabrid leaf margins armed with minute teeth pointing to the leaf apex. The flowering stems are erect and triangular in cross-section, standing well above the leaves. Nutlets are small and trigonous, often crowned by a persistent style, and are consumed by the Chacma baboon.
