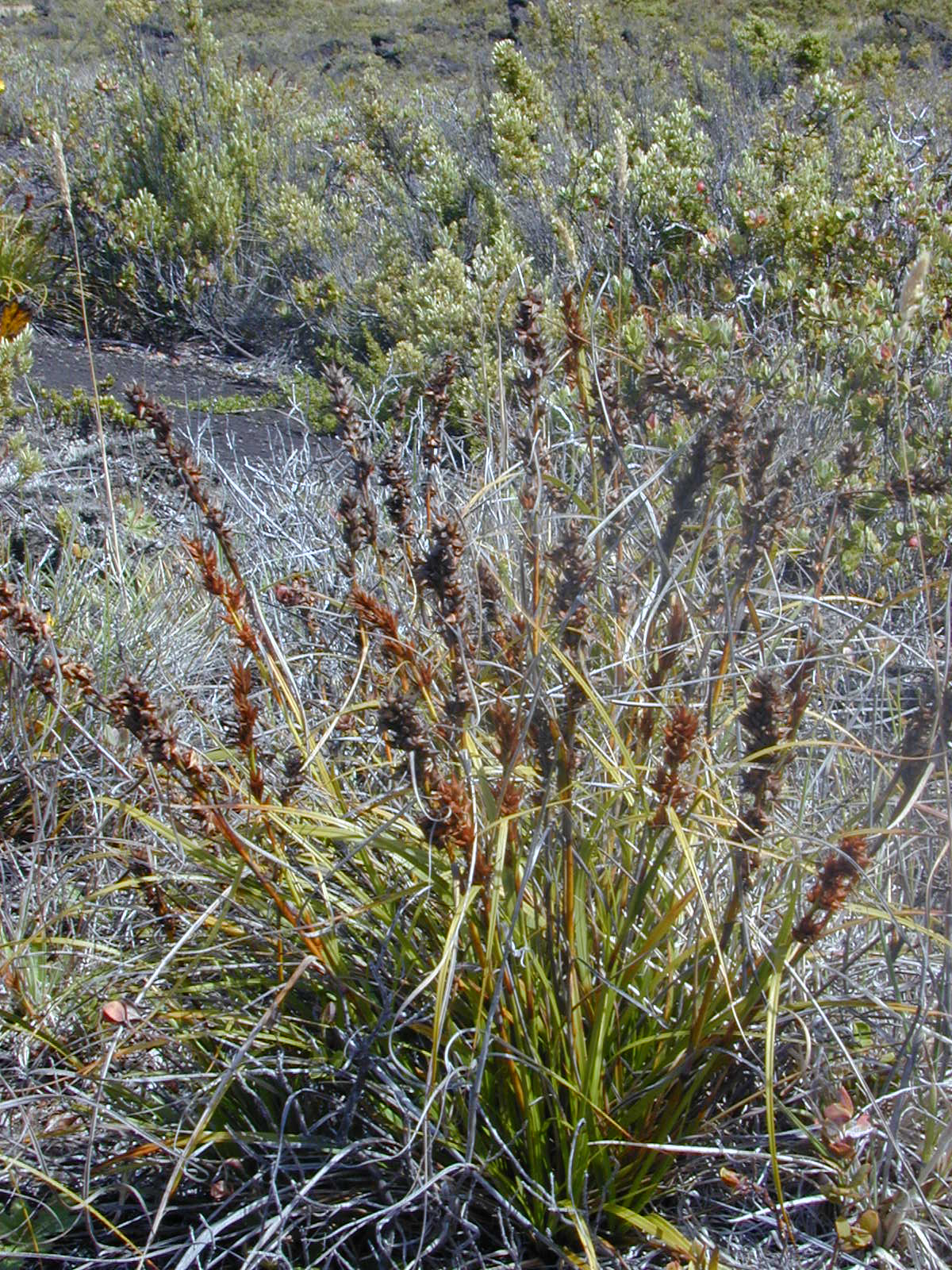
- Morelotia gahniiformis

Scientific classification
- Kingdom: Plantae
- Clade: Tracheophytes
- Clade: Angiosperms
- Clade: Monocots
- Clade: Commelinids
- Order: Poales
- Family: Cyperaceae
- Subtribe: Tricostulariinae
- Genus: Morelotia; Gaudich.

= Morelotia =

Genus of flowering plant

Morelotia is a genus of flowering plants belonging to the family Cyperaceae. It contains six species of sedges native to New Zealand, the Hawaiian Islands, Tubuai Islands, and Western Australia.

The genus name of Morelotia is in honour of Simon Morelot (1751–1809), a French apothecary and also member and professor at the college of pharmacy. It was first described and published in Voy. Uranie on page 416 in 1829.

== Known species ==
According to Kew:

- Morelotia affinis (Brongn.) S.T.Blake – New Zealand
- Morelotia australiensis (C.B.Clarke) R.L.Barrett & K.L.Wilson – Southwest Australia
- Morelotia gahniiformis Gaudich. – Hawaiian Islands
- Morelotia involuta (H.St.John) J.J.Bruhl & R.L.Barrett – Tubuai Islands
- Morelotia microcarpa (S.T.Blake) R.L.Barrett & K.L.Wilson – Southwest Australia
- Morelotia octandra (Nees) R.L.Barrett & J.J.Bruhl – Southwest Australia
