= Hans Heinrich Pfeiffer =

German botanist and physiologist

- Born: 10 January 1896
- Died: 1970 (aged 73–74)
- Scientific career
- Fields: Botany
- Author abbrev. (botany): H.Pfeiff.

Hans Heinrich Pfeiffer (10 January 1896 (Note: Discussion on JSTOR gives 1896 as his birth year and 1970 as his death year, as does the Russian Wikipedia article. This conflicts with IPNI, which gives his birth year as 1890.) - 1970) was a German botanist and physiologist, with a particular interest in spermatophytes.

The standard author abbreviation H.Pfeiff. is used to indicate this person as the author when citing a botanical name.

== Some published names ==
(incomplete list)

- Cyperaceae Androtrichum giganteum (Kunth) H.Pfeiff. Revista Sudamer. Bot. 6: 185. 1940
- Cyperaceae Androtrichum trigynum (Spreng.) H.Pfeiff. Repert. Spec. Nov. Regni Veg. 42: 10. 1937
- Cyperaceae Becquerelia bicolor H.Pfeiff. Repert. Spec. Nov. Regni Veg. 18: 381. 1922
- Cyperaceae Becquerelia bicolor H.Pfeiff. Repert. Spec. Nov. Regni Veg. 18: 381. 1922
- Cyperaceae Becquerelia bicolor f. humilis H.Pfeiff. Repert. Spec. Nov. Regni Veg. 18: 382. 1922
- Cyperaceae Becquerelia bicolor f. ramosissima H.Pfeiff. Repert. Spec. Nov. Regni Veg. 18: 382. 1922
- Cyperaceae Becquerelia bicolor f. verticillata H.Pfeiff. Repert. Spec. Nov. Regni Veg. 18: 382. 1922
- Cyperaceae Becquerelia bullata C.B.Clarke & H.Pfeiff. Repert. Spec. Nov. Regni Veg. 18: 382. 1922

(These may not be accepted names.)

== Some publications ==
- 1938. Submikroskopische Morphologie des Protoplasmas, 73 Gebr. Borntraeger, Berlín
- 1940. Experimentelle Cytologie, 35 et seq. Chron. Bot. Co. Leyden
- 1948. Kolloid-Z. Z. Naturforsch. 1 : 461
- 1948. Birefringence and Orientation-Rate of the Leptones of Protoplasm. Nature 162 : 419–420. doi:10.1038/162419a0
- 1958. Kuster, E; Pfeiffer, H.H. Osmotischer wert, Saugkraft, turgor. Ed. Vienna : Springer-Verlag. 7 pp.

=== Books ===
- Huss, W; Pfeiffer, H.H. (1948). Zellkern und Vererbung (Núcleos celulares y características). Ed. Schwab. 160 pp.
- Pfeiffer, H.H. (1949). Das Polarisationsmikroskop als Messinstrument in Biologie und Medizin (The polarizing microscope as a measuring instrument in biology and medicine). Ed. Vieweg. 94 pp.
- ----- (1940). Experimentelle cytologie. Ed. F.Verdoorn, vol. 4. 240 pp. 28 il.

(taken from es:Hans Heinrich Pfeiffer)
