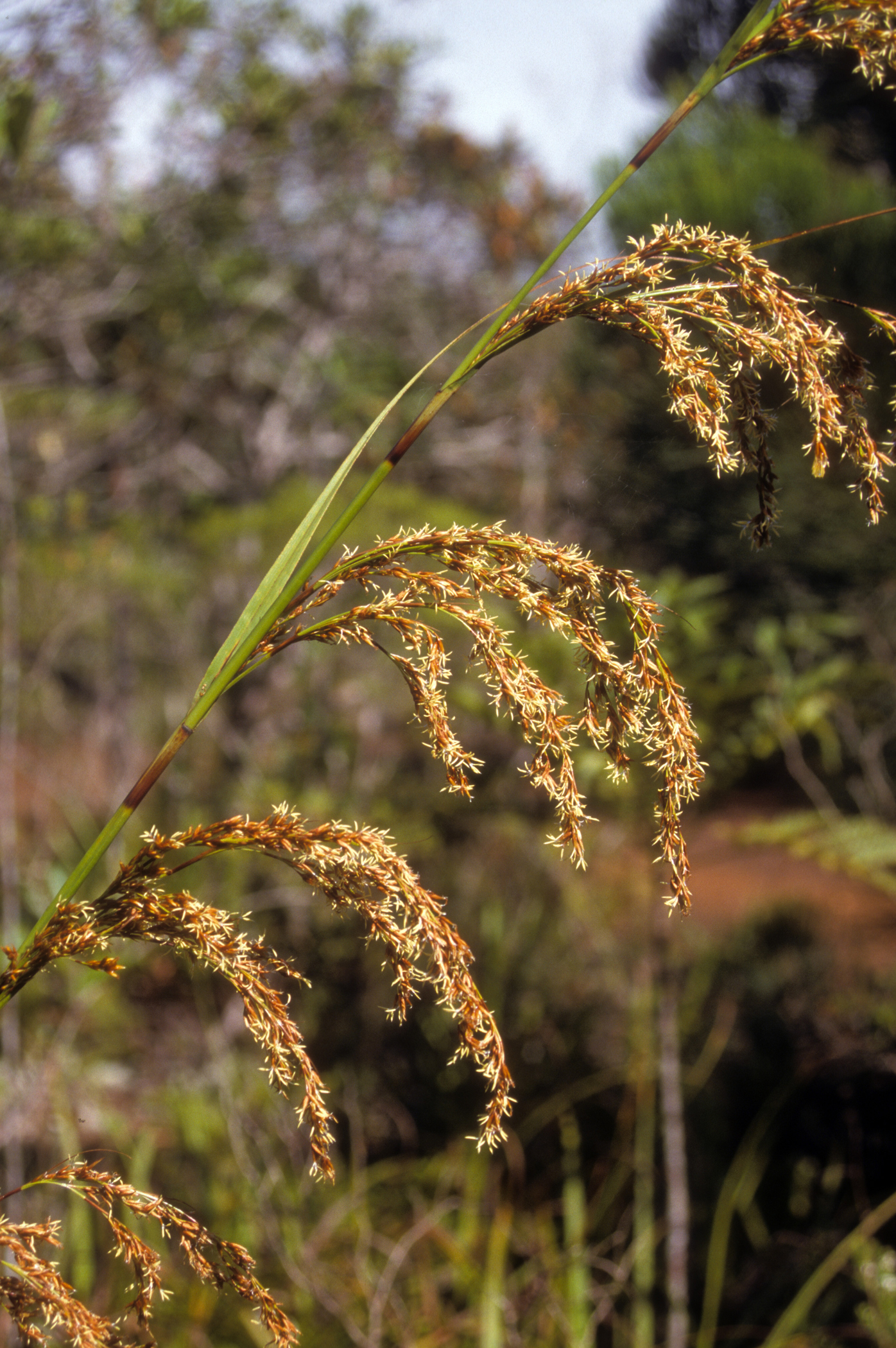
- Costularia sp.

Scientific classification
- Kingdom: Plantae
- Clade: Tracheophytes
- Clade: Angiosperms
- Clade: Monocots
- Clade: Commelinids
- Order: Poales
- Family: Cyperaceae
- Genus: Costularia; C.B.Clarke

Synonyms
- Cyclocampe Benth. & Hook.f. (1883), nom. illeg.; Lophoschoenus Stapf (1914)

= Costularia =

Genus of grass-like plants

Costularia is a plant genus in the family Cyperaceae. It includes 15 species native to southeastern Africa, ranging from South Africa (KwaZulu-Natal and Northern Provinces) through Eswatini, Mozambique, Zimbabwe, and Malawi, and to the islands Madagascar, Réunion, and the Seychelles in the Western Indian Ocean.

The genus was formerly circumscribed to include 25 species. A molecular phylogenetic study found that circumscription to include four distinct lineages:

1. Costularia s.s. (11 species) from Africa, Madagascar, the Mascarene Islands and Seychelles.
2. Chamaedendron Larridon (five species) from New Caledonia.
3. a group largely conforming to subgenus Lophoschoenus (eight species) from New Caledonia and Malesia that are now considered to be part of a redelimited genus Tetraria.
4. the species Xyroschoenus hornei, which is endemic to the Seychelles.

In 2019, the genus was revised to include 15 species, generally corresponding to Costularia s.s. and including a few previously undescribed species.

== List of species ==
15 species are accepted:

- Costularia andringitrensis Larridon
- Costularia brevifolia Cherm.
- Costularia cadetii Larridon
- Costularia humbertii Bosser
- Costularia itremoensis Larridon
- Costularia laxa Cherm.
- Costularia leucocarpa (Ridl.) Pfeiff.
- Costularia melicoides (Poir.) C.B.Clarke
- Costularia melleri (Baker) C.B.Clarke
- Costularia microcarpa (Cherm.) Kük.
- Costularia natalensis C.B.Clarke
- Costularia pantopoda (Baker) C.B.Clarke
- Costularia purpurea Cherm.
- Costularia robusta (Cherm.) Larridon
- Costularia xipholepis (Baker) Henriette & Senterre

=== Formerly placed here ===
Xyroschoenus hornei (as Costularia hornei (C.B.Clarke) Kük.)
