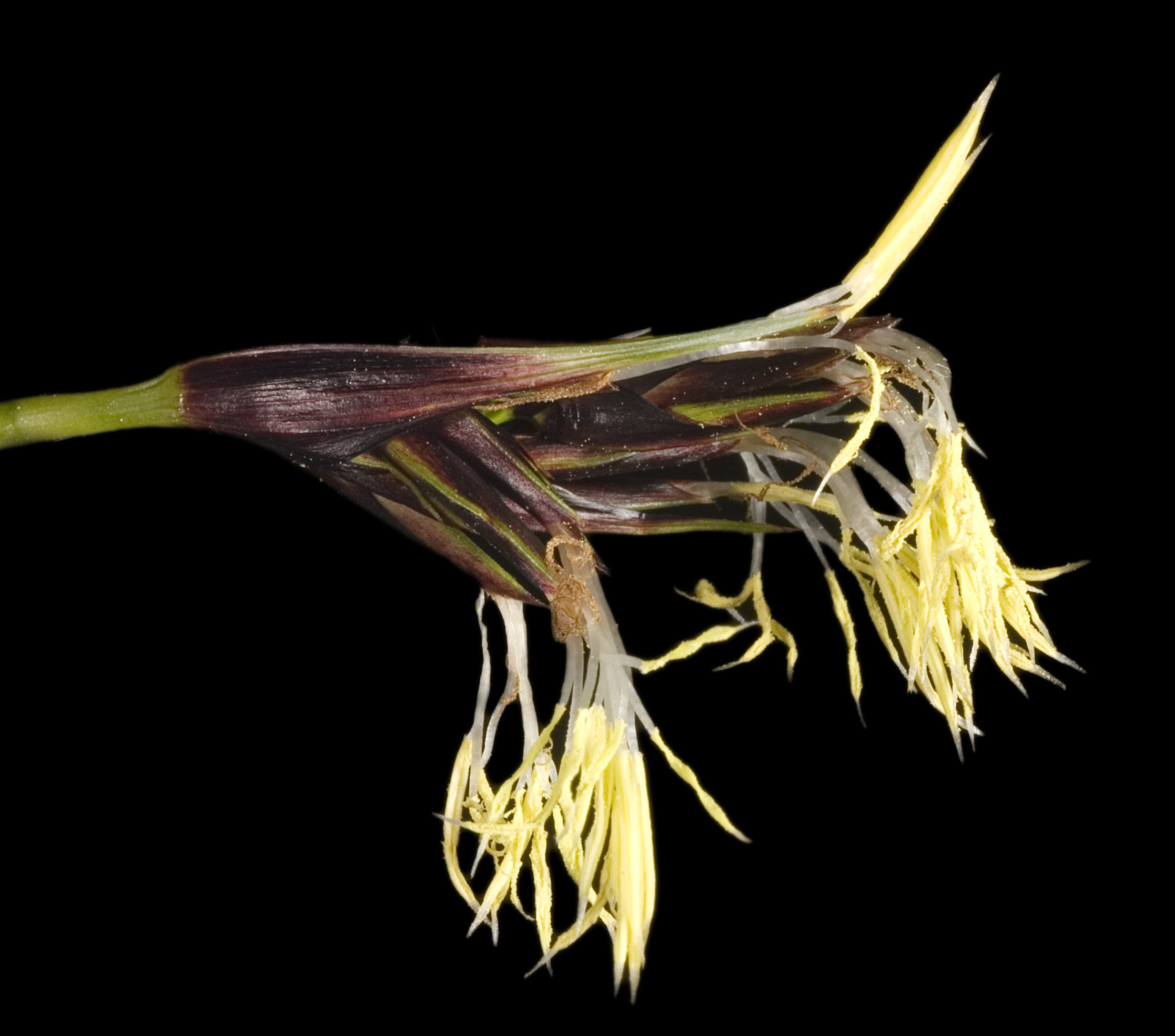
- Tetraria octandra

Scientific classification
- Kingdom: Plantae
- Clade: Tracheophytes
- Clade: Angiosperms
- Clade: Monocots
- Clade: Commelinids
- Order: Poales
- Family: Cyperaceae
- Genus: Tetraria; P.Beauv. (1812 publ. 1816)

Species
- 40; see text

Synonyms
- Aulacorhynchus' Nees (1834); Boeckeleria T.Durand (1888); Decalepis Boeckeler (1884); Elynanthus Nees (1832), nom. illeg.; Ideleria Kunth (1837); Lepisia C.Presl (1829); Macrochaetium Steud. (1855); Schoenopsis P.Beauv. ex T.Lestib. (1819); Sclerochaetium Nees (1832); Tetrariopsis C.B.Clarke (1908); Trichoballia C.Presl (1829)

= Tetraria =

Genus of grass-like plants

Tetraria is a genus of flowering plants in the sedge family, Cyperaceae, native to Tanzania, South Africa, Borneo, Australia and New Zealand.

The type species is Tetraria compar (L.) P.Beauv.

Recent molecular work has shown that Tetraria is polyphyletic and in need of revision.

== Description ==
Tetraria are perennial herbs, with generally few nodes. The leaves are conspicuously sheathed with flat or incurved blades. The inflorescence is usually a narrow panicle, with the flowers being bisexual, the lower flowers being male, and there are generally three stamens and three stigmas. The fruit (a nutlet) is generally trigonous and often retains its style as a beak or crown.

== List of species ==
40 species are currently accepted by Plants of the World Online:

- Tetraria arundinacea (Sol. ex Vahl) T.Koyama
- Tetraria borneensis J.Kern
- Tetraria breviseta (J.Raynal) Larridon
- Tetraria bromoides (Lam.) H.Pfeiff.
- Tetraria burmanni (Vahl) C.B.Clarke
- Tetraria capillacea (Thunb.) C.B.Clarke
- Tetraria cernua (Levyns) Larridon
- Tetraria comosa (C.B.Clarke) T.Koyama
- Tetraria compressa Turrill
- Tetraria crinifolia (Nees) C.B.Clarke
- Tetraria eximia C.B.Clarke
- Tetraria fasciata (Rottb.) C.B.Clarke
- Tetraria ferruginea C.B.Clarke
- Tetraria fimbriolata (Nees) C.B.Clarke
- Tetraria flexuosa (Thunb.) C.B.Clarke
- Tetraria fourcadei Turrill & Schönland
- Tetraria involucrata (Rottb.) C.B.Clarke
- Tetraria macowaniana B.L.Burtt
- Tetraria maculata Schönland & Turrill
- Tetraria microstachys (Vahl) H.Pfeiff.
- Tetraria mlanjensis J.Raynal
- Tetraria nigrovaginata (Nees) C.B.Clarke
- Tetraria pilisepala (Steud.) Larridon
- Tetraria pillansii Levyns
- Tetraria pleosticha C.B.Clarke
- Tetraria pubescens Schönland & Turrill
- Tetraria pygmaea Levyns
- Tetraria raynaliana Larridon
- Tetraria robusta (Kunth) C.B.Clarke
- Tetraria scariosa Kük.
- Tetraria secans C.B.Clarke
- Tetraria setacea (J.Raynal) Larridon
- Tetraria spiralis (Hochst.) C.B.Clarke
- Tetraria stagnalis (Däniker) T.Koyama
- Tetraria sylvestris (J.Raynal) Larridon
- Tetraria thermalis (L.) C.B.Clarke
- Tetraria triangularis (Boeckeler) C.B.Clarke
- Tetraria usambarensis K.Schum.
- Tetraria ustulata (L.) C.B.Clarke
- Tetraria vaginata Schönland & Turrill
