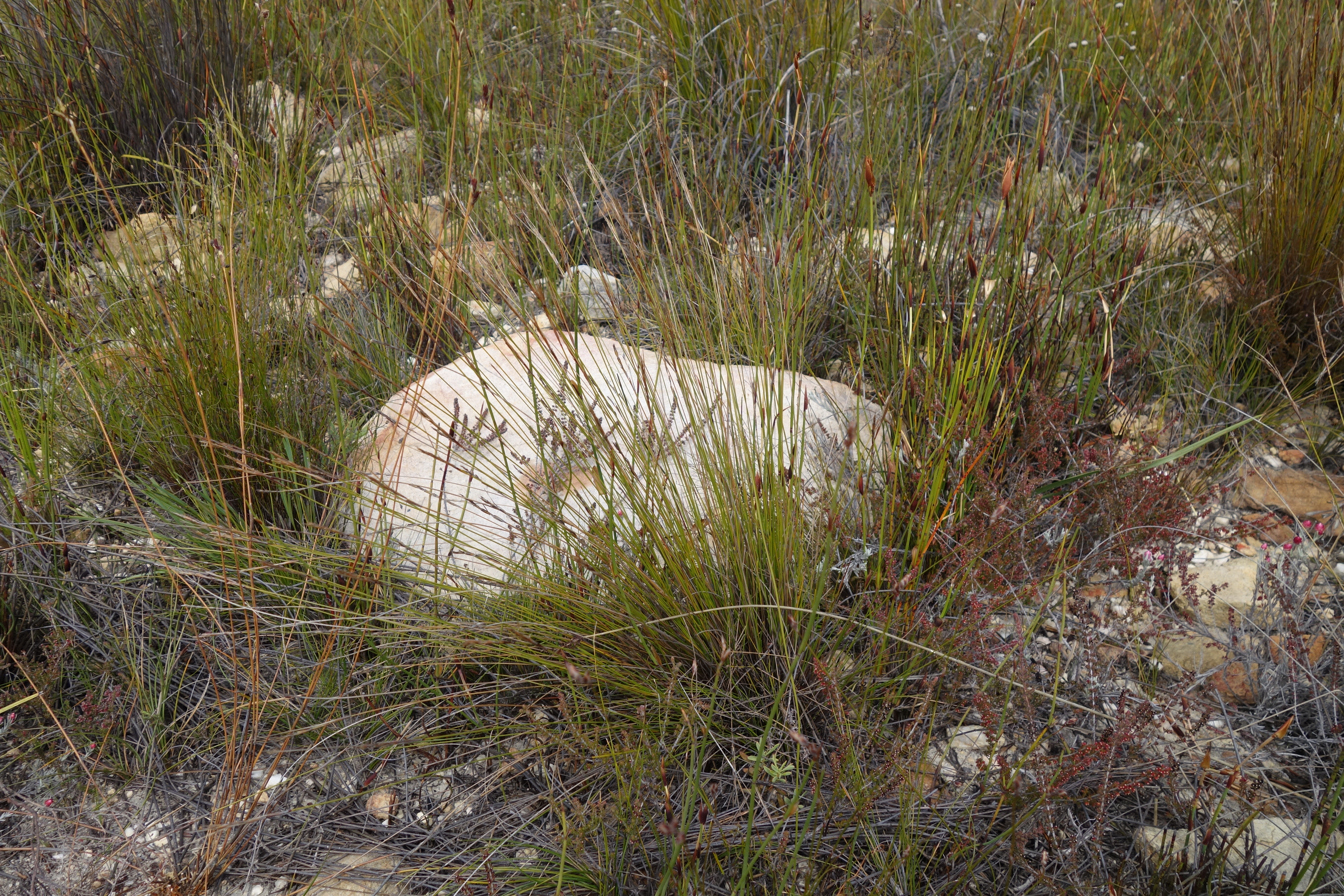
- Bristleglume Veldrush

Scientific classification
- Kingdom: Plantae
- Clade: Tracheophytes
- Clade: Angiosperms
- Clade: Monocots
- Clade: Commelinids
- Order: Poales
- Family: Cyperaceae
- Genus: Schoenus
- Species: S. bracteosus

Binomial name
- Schoenus bracteosus T.L.Elliott & Muasya
- Documented collection localities in South Africa

Synonyms
- None

= Schoenus bracteosus =

Species of grass-like plant

Schoenus bracteosus is a species of sedge endemic to the mountains of southern South Africa.

== Description ==
Schoenus bracteosus has firm primary inflorescence bracts that enclose its spikes and culm bases that are firm and non-viscous. This species also has short hairs on its spikelet glumes.

The flowering heads of S. bracteosus resemble those of Schoenus pictus, as they are firm and enclose its spikes; however, S. pictus has viscous culm bases, whereas S. bracteosus lacks this character.

The firm culm bases of S. bracteosus contrast with the membranaceous sheaths of other southern African Schoenus species, such as Schoenus aureus and Schoenus megacarpus.

Plants in the southern African Schoenus clade are very difficult to identify, which is similar to other sedges. It appears that part of this problem is caused by the tendency of the southern African Schoenus to form hybrids with each other. Preliminary evidence suggests that S. bracteosus might form hybrids with other southern African Schoenus species in both the Schoenus cuspidatus and allies group and the Schoenus compar – Schoenus pictus and allies group.

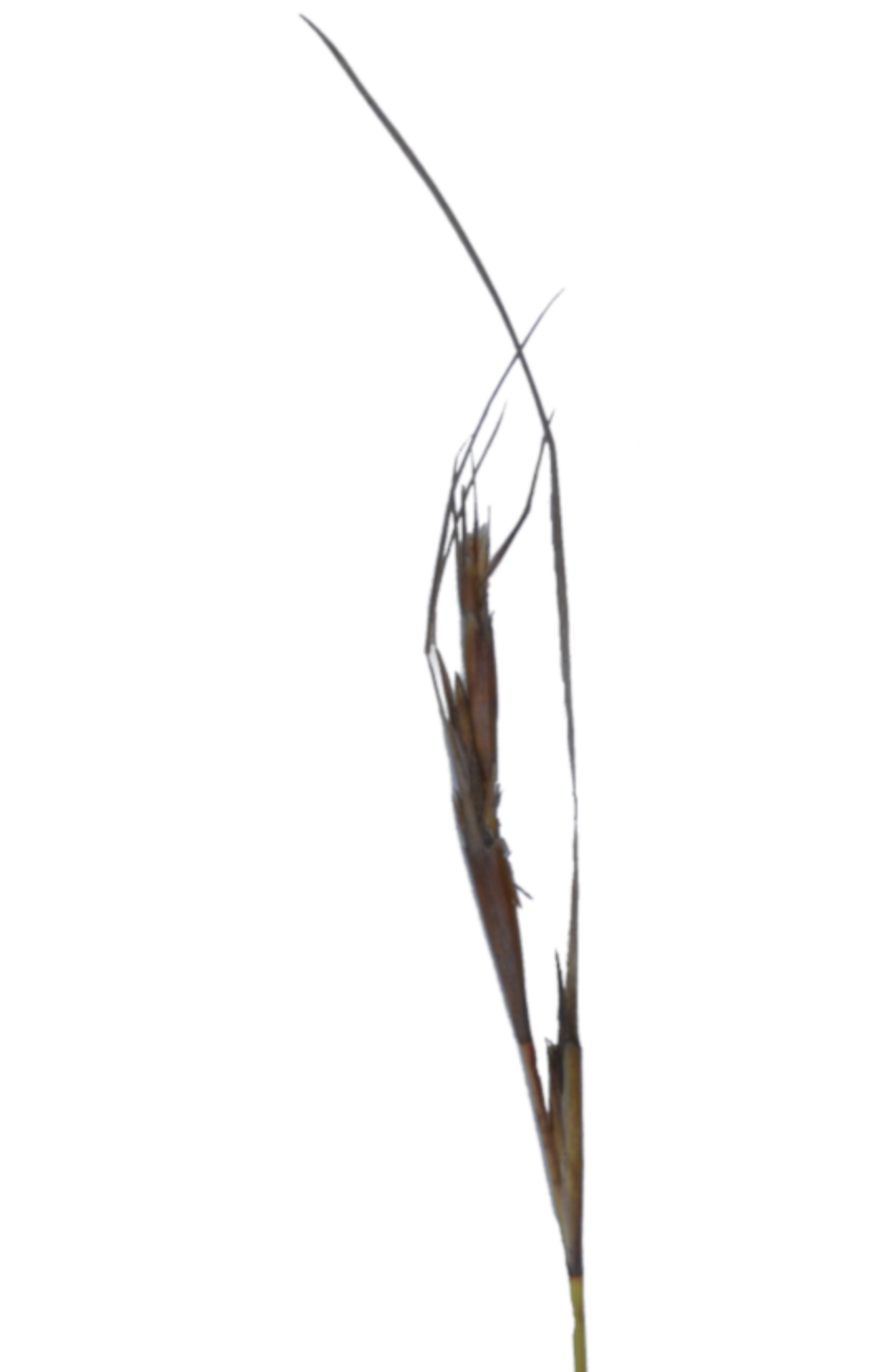
Flowering head

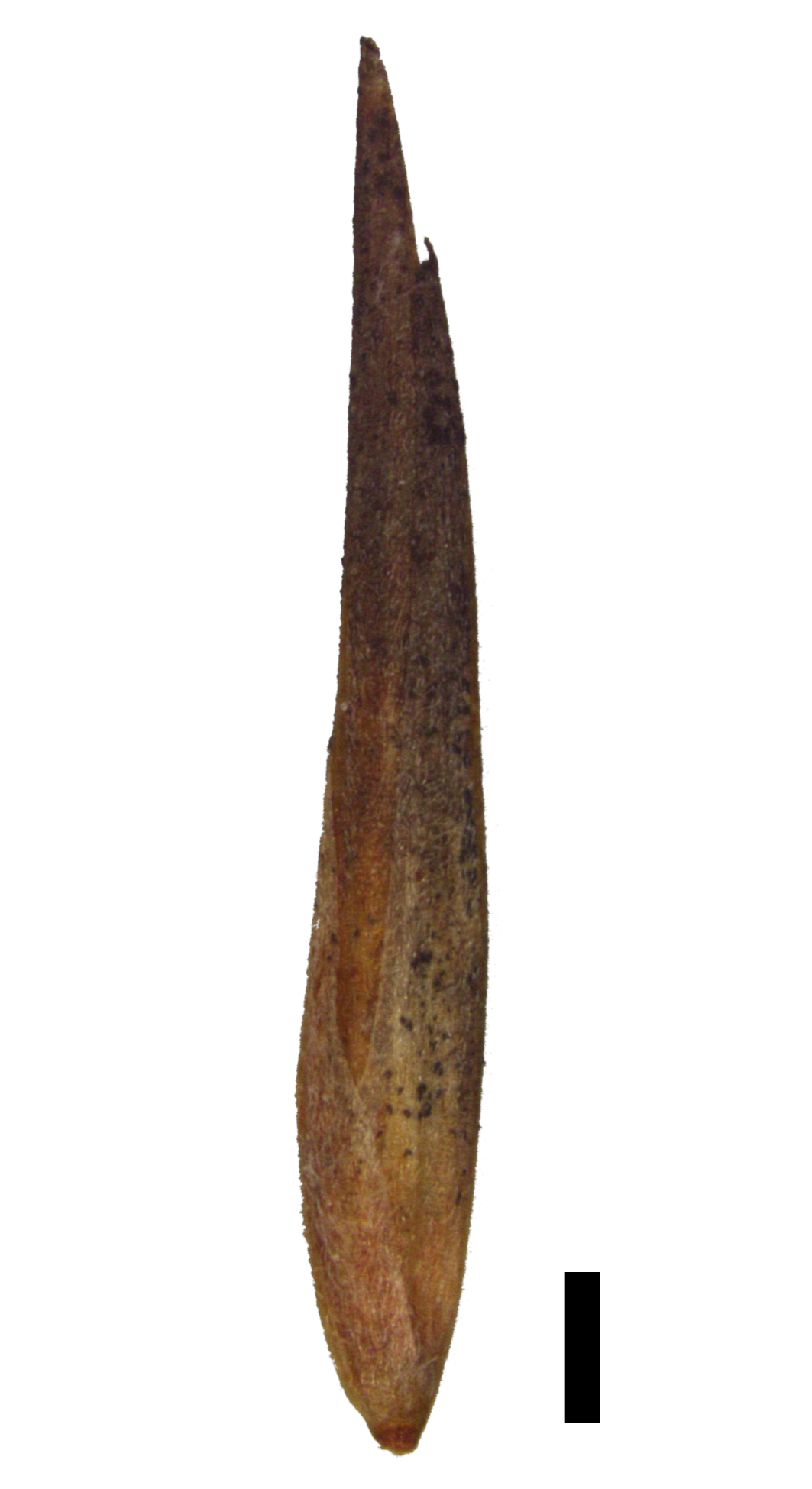
Spikelet (black scale bar represents 1 mm)

== Taxonomy ==
Schoenus bracteosus is a species in family Cyperaceae, tribe Schoeneae. Other notable genera in tribe Schoeneae include Lepidosperma, Oreobolus, Costularia, Tetraria and Gahnia. The most closely related species to S. bracteosus are other southern African Schoenus species, but it is not clear whether this species is more related to those in the Schoenus cuspidatus and allies group or the Schoenus compar - Schoenus pictus and allies group.

Southern African Schoenus were once classified as Tetraria; however, based on molecular and morphological differences, we now know that the two groups are evolutionary distinct. To ensure that this group of sedges is monophyletic (i.e. the genus only has closely related species), several species of Epischoenus and the southern African Tetraria were transferred into Schoenus. In the field, the southern African Schoenus can be distinguished from Tetraria species by their lack of stem leaves and the absence of reticulate sheaths at the bases of the flowering stems.

== Distribution and habitat ==
Schoenus bracteosus is known to occur in the Marloth Nature Reserve of the Western Cape Province of South Africa, where it has been observed on lower mountain slopes.
