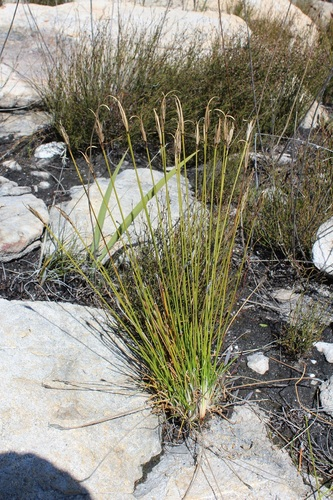
- Whitesheath Veldrush

Scientific classification
- Kingdom: Plantae
- Clade: Tracheophytes
- Clade: Angiosperms
- Clade: Monocots
- Clade: Commelinids
- Order: Poales
- Family: Cyperaceae
- Genus: Schoenus
- Species: S. albovaginatus

Binomial name
- Schoenus albovaginatus T.L.Elliott & Muasya
- Documented collection localities in South Africa

Synonyms
- Tetraria sylvatica var. triflora Kük

= Schoenus albovaginatus =

Species of grass-like plant

Schoenus albovaginatus is a species of sedge endemic to the mountains of south-western South Africa.

== Description ==
The key diagnostic character of S. albovaginatus is its ivory-colored, membranaceous leaf sheaths. The inflorescence of S. albovaginatus is short and congested, appearing compressed between its lower primary inflorescence bracts. Another key morphological character of S. albovaginatus are its relatively long and numerous perianth bristles.

Similar to S. albovaginatus, Schoenus aureus and Schoenus triticoides also have ivory-colored, membranaceous, loose leaf sheaths; however, the inflorescence shapes of the latter two species differ from that of S. albovaginatus. The lower inflorescence bracts of S. albovaginatus do not have the marginal membranaceous extensions that are evident in S. aureus and S. triticoides. In addition, the wheat-like panicle of S. triticoides is longer than the short, compressed inflorescence of S. albovaginatus. Finally, neither S. aureus nor S. triticoides have the long perianth bristles that are present in the spikelets of S. albovaginatus.

The flowering heads of S. albovaginatus resemble those of Schoenus pictus; however, the latter species lacks the membranaceous leaf sheaths present in S. albovaginatus.

Plants in the southern African Schoenus clade are very difficult to identify, which is similar to other sedges. It appears that part of this problem is caused by the tendency of the southern African Schoenus to form hybrids with each other. It is not clear whether S. albovaginatus forms hybrids with other southern African Schoenus species.

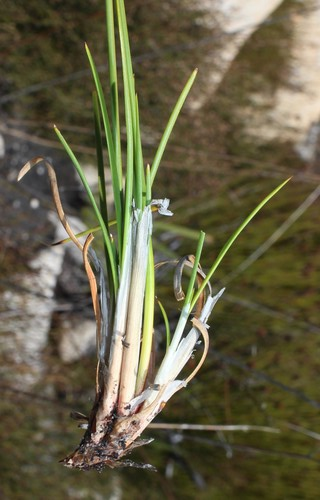
Membranaceous base of plant

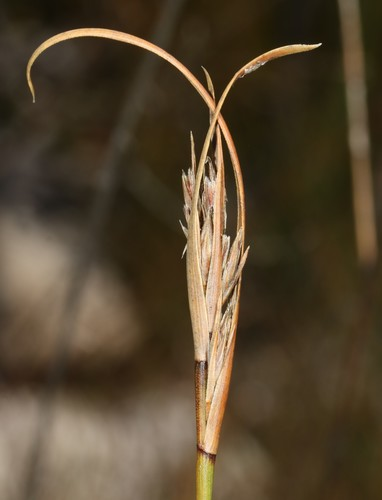
Flowering heads

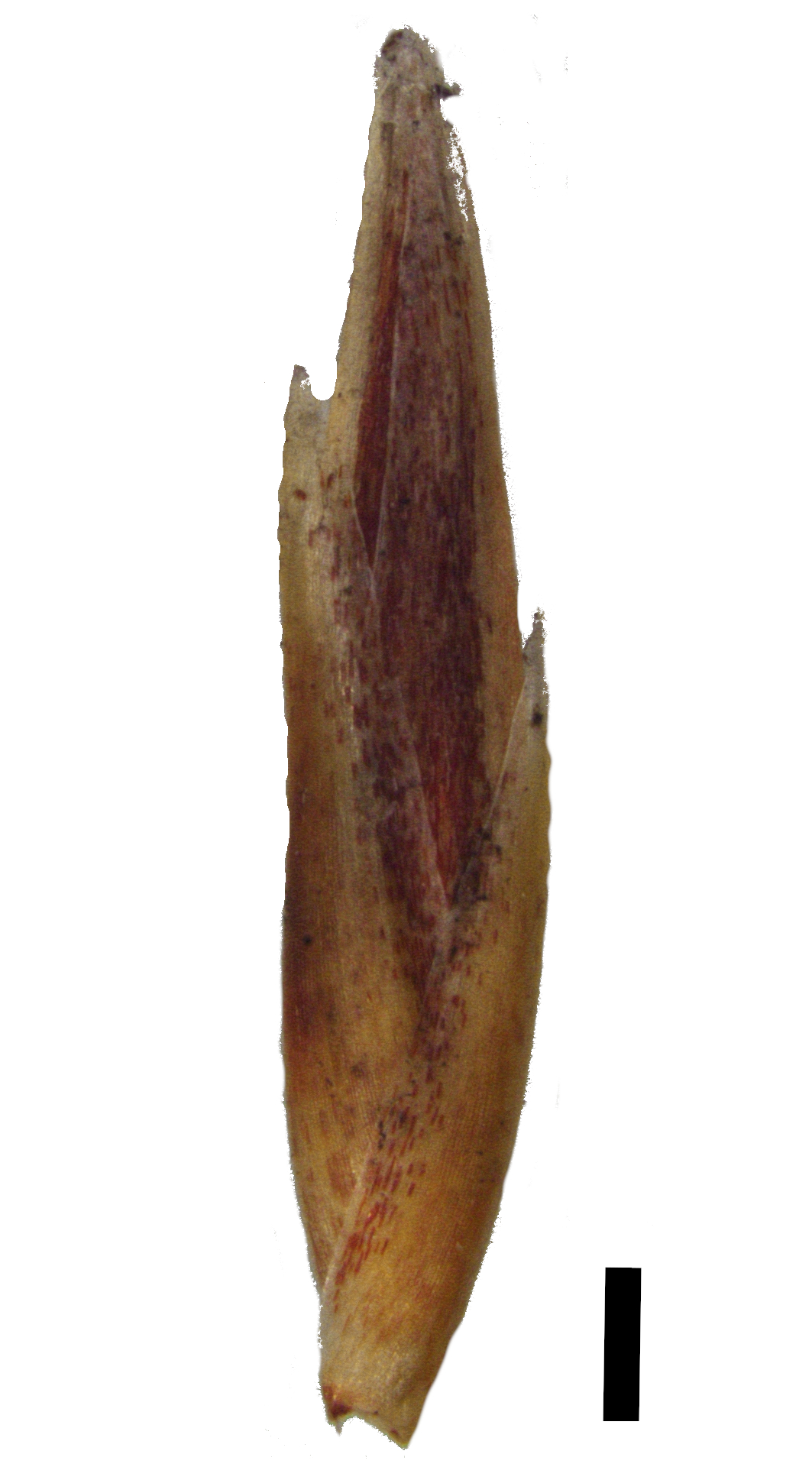
Spikelet (black scale bar represents 1 mm)

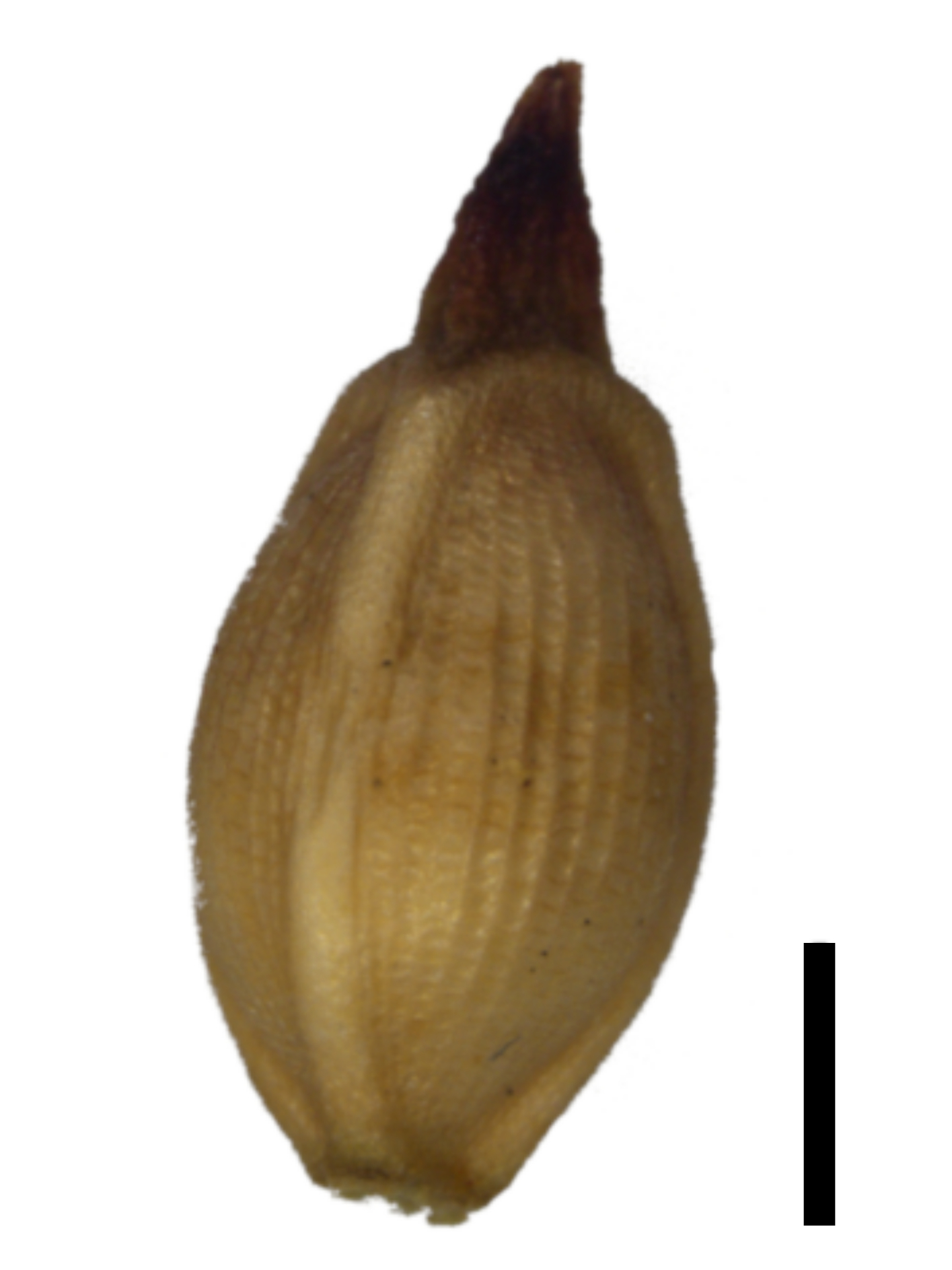
Nutlet (black scale bar represents 1 mm)

== Taxonomy ==
Schoenus albovaginatus is a species in family Cyperaceae, tribe Schoeneae. Other notable genera in tribe Schoeneae include Lepidosperma, Oreobolus, Costularia, Tetraria and Gahnia. The most closely related species to S. albovaginatus are other southern African Schoenus species, specifically, species in the Schoenus compar - Schoenus pictus and allies group.

Southern African Schoenus were once classified as Tetraria; however, based on molecular and morphological differences, we now know that the two groups are evolutionary distinct. To ensure that this group of sedges is monophyletic (i.e. the genus only has closely related species), several species of Epischoenus and the southern African Tetraria were transferred into Schoenus. In the field, the southern African Schoenus can be distinguished from Tetraria species by their lack of stem leaves and the absence of reticulate sheaths at the bases of the flowering stems.

== Distribution and habitat ==
Schoenus albovaginatus has been observed growing in high mountain sites (> 900 m) in the southwestern mountains of South Africa, specifically in the Koue Bokkeveld and Hex River Mountain areas. One collection has also been made in the area near Worcester.
