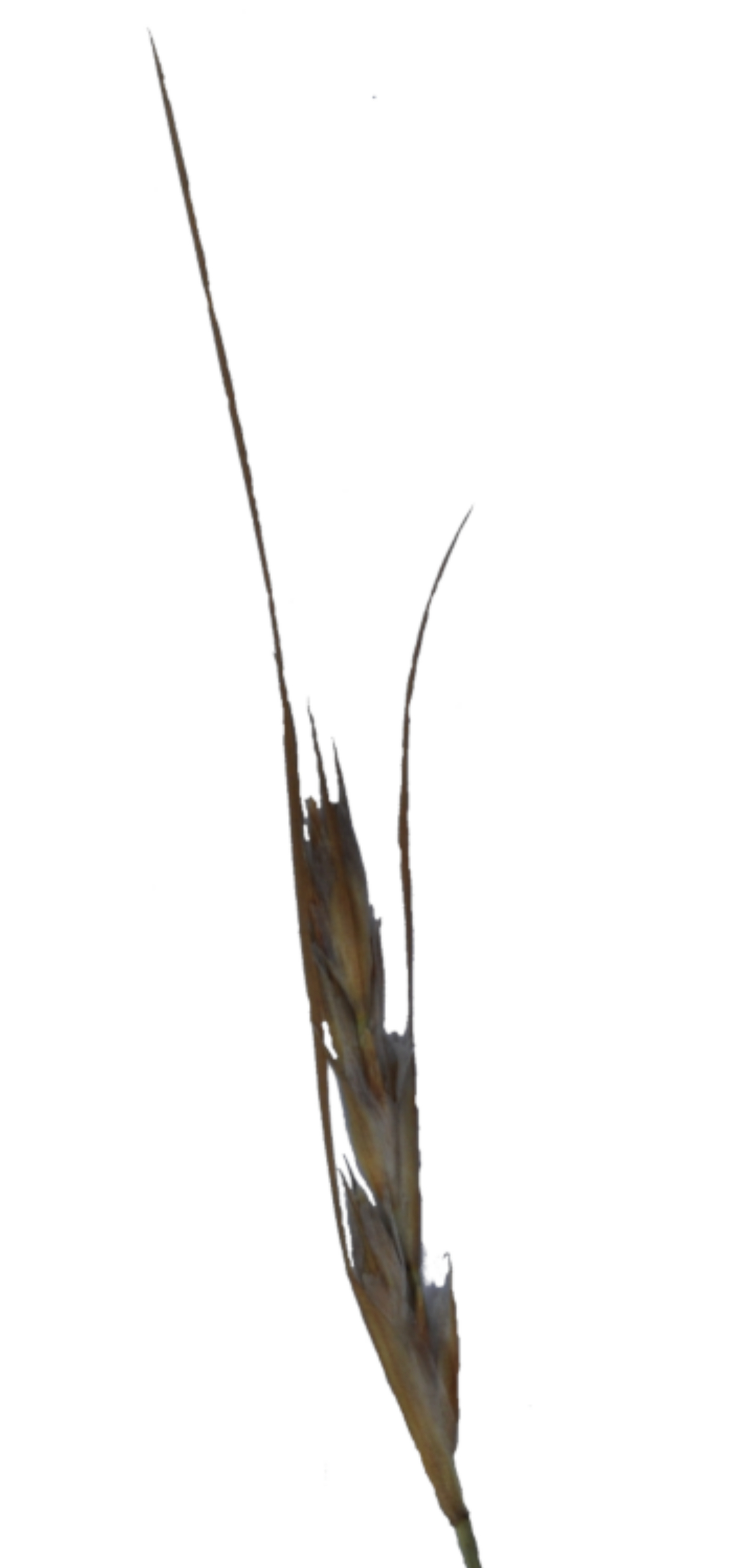
- Wheat Veldrush

Scientific classification
- Kingdom: Plantae
- Clade: Embryophytes
- Clade: Tracheophytes
- Clade: Spermatophytes
- Clade: Angiosperms
- Clade: Monocots
- Clade: Commelinids
- Order: Poales
- Family: Cyperaceae
- Genus: Schoenus
- Species: S. triticoides

Binomial name
- Schoenus triticoides T.L.Elliott & Muasya
- Documented collection localities in South Africa

Synonyms
- None

= Schoenus triticoides =

Species of grass-like plant

Schoenus triticoides is a species of sedge endemic to the mountains of southern South Africa.

== Description ==
Schoenus triticoides is a species with ivory coloured culm bases and leaf sheaths, which are open and membranaceous. The inflorescence of this species is a relatively long and straw coloured spike-like panicle that somewhat resembles the flowering heads of wheat. The primary inflorescence bracts of this species have membranaceous extensions (i.e. auricles) that are expanded at their base.

Schoenus triticoides most resembles Schoenus aureus vegetatively, but the inflorescence of S. triticoides is longer than the more compact panicles of S. aureus. Another difference is that the veins on the primary inflorescence bracts of S. triticoides are more pronounced compared to the more inconspicuous veins of S. aureus.

Plants in the southern African Schoenus clade are very difficult to identify, which is similar to other sedges. It appears that part of this problem is caused by the tendency of the southern African Schoenus to form hybrids with each other. It is not clear whether S. triticoides forms hybrids with other southern African Schoenus species, but if it does, it would most likely hybridize with species in the Schoenus compar – Schoenus pictus and allies group.

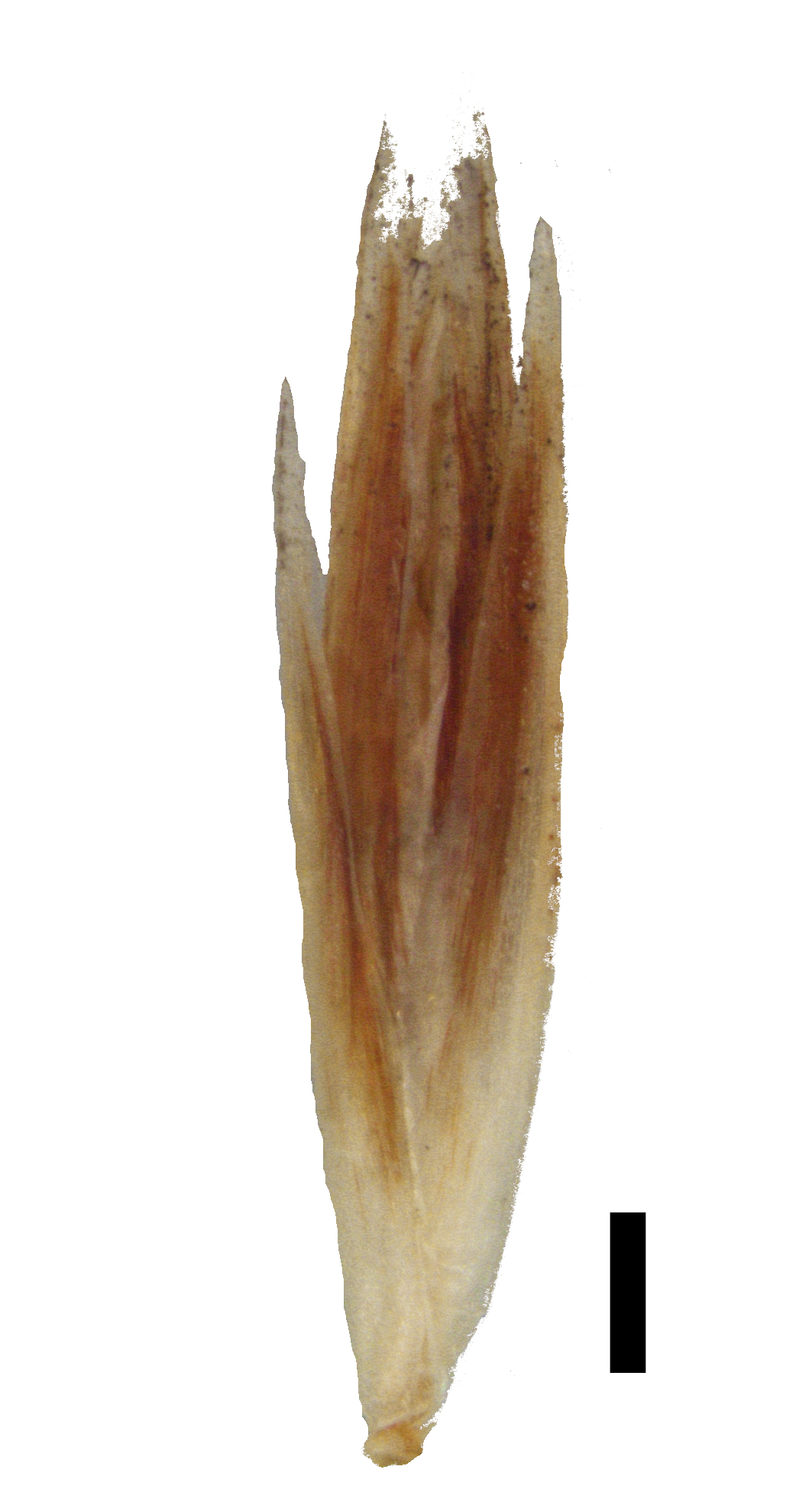
Spikelet (black scale bar represents 1 mm)

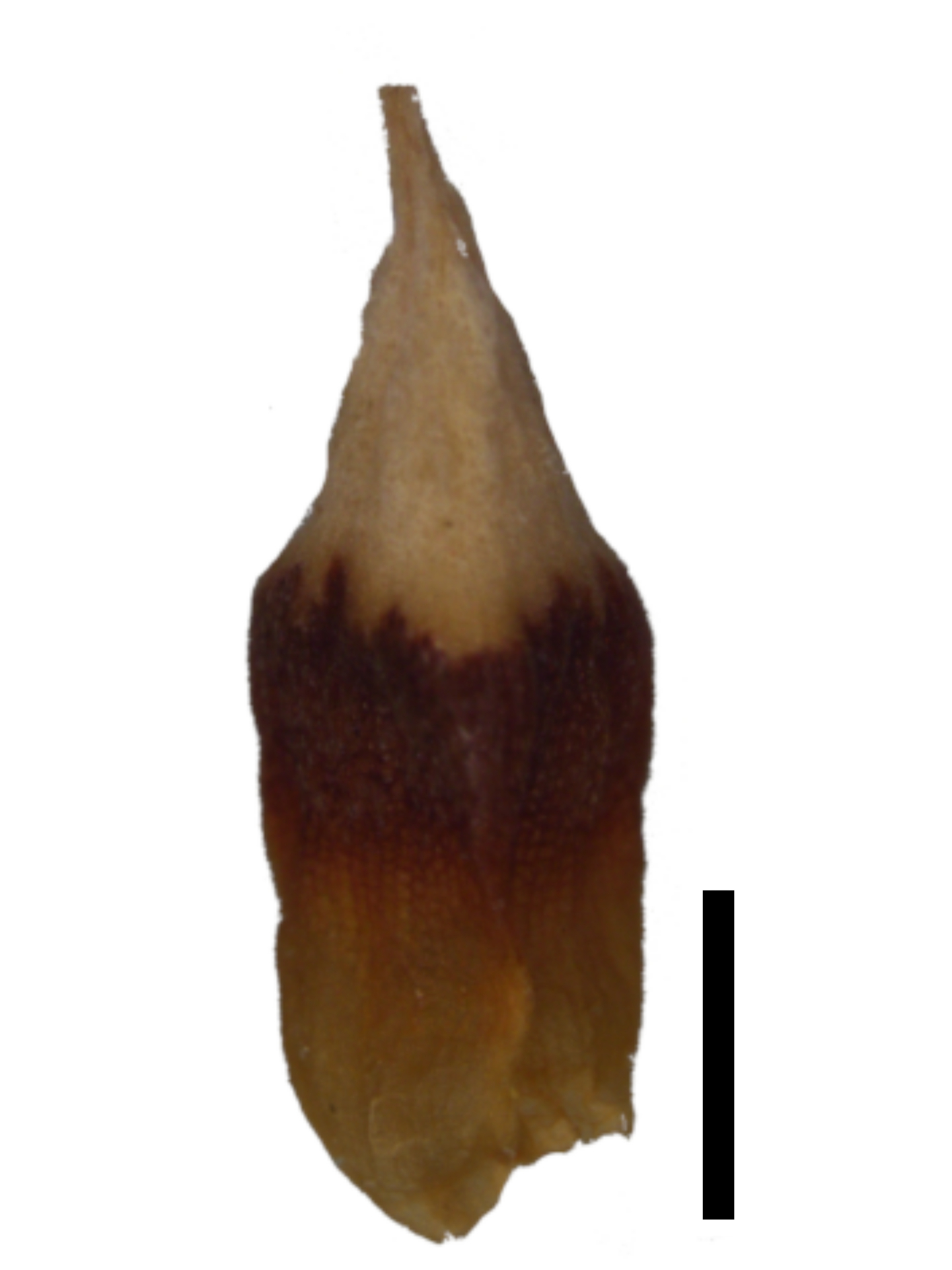
Spikelet (black scale bar represents 1 mm)

== Taxonomy ==
Schoenus triticoides is a species in family Cyperaceae, tribe Schoeneae. Other notable genera in tribe Schoeneae include Lepidosperma, Oreobolus, Costularia, Tetraria and Gahnia. The most closely related species to S. triticoides are other southern African Schoenus species, specifically, species in the Schoenus compar – Schoenus pictus and allies group.

Southern African Schoenus were once classified as Tetraria; however, based on molecular and morphological differences, we now know that the two groups are evolutionary distinct. To ensure that this group of sedges is monophyletic (i.e. the genus only has closely related species), several species of Epischoenus and the southern African Tetraria were transferred into Schoenus. In the field, the southern African Schoenus can be distinguished from Tetraria species by their lack of stem leaves and the absence of reticulate sheaths at the bases of the flowering stems.

== Distribution and habitat ==
Schoenus triticoides is known to occur near Tierhuiskloof in the Western Cape Province of South Africa, where it has been observed growing along a jeep trail on a lower mountain slope.
