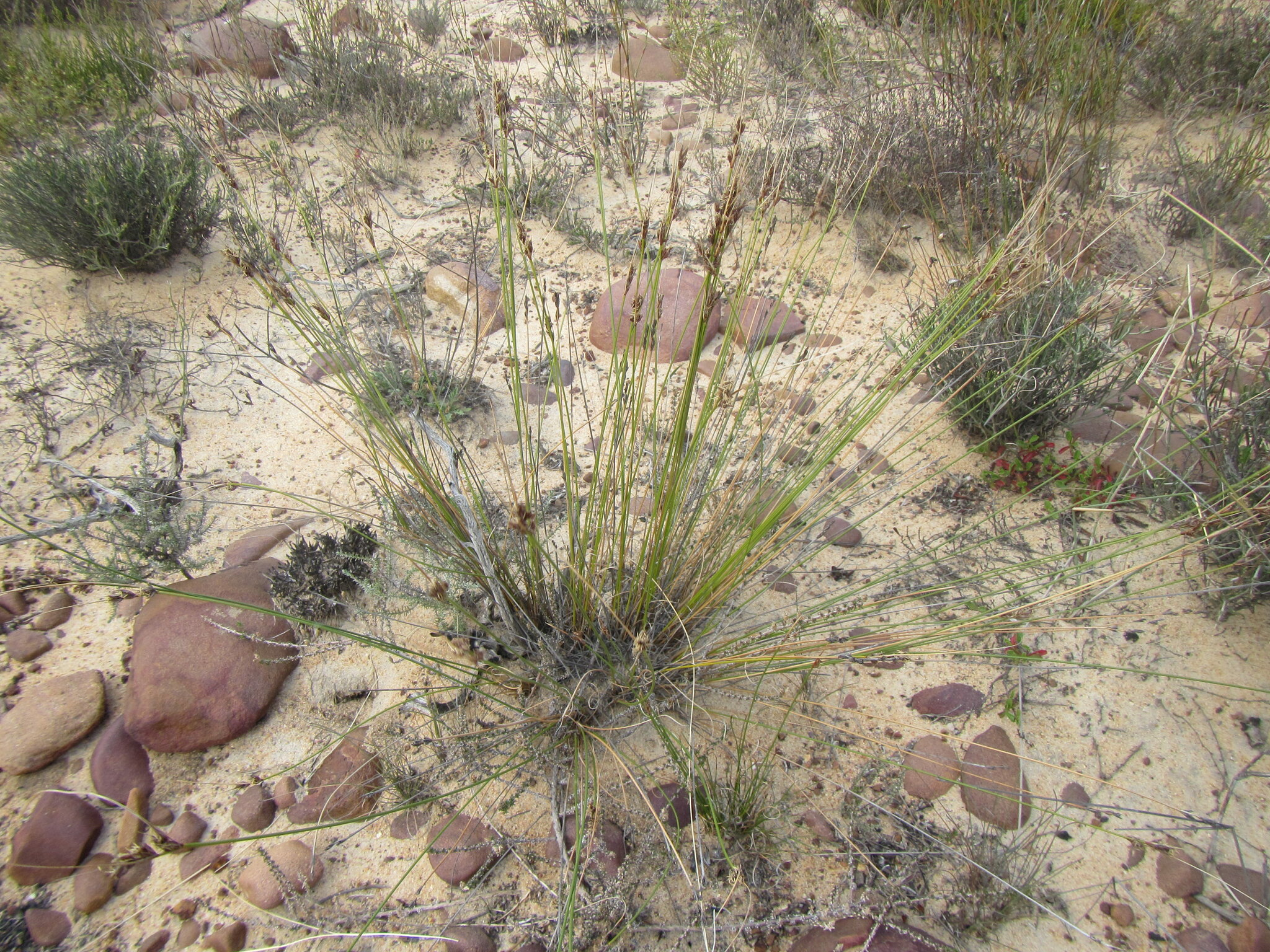
- Gold veldrush

Scientific classification
- Kingdom: Plantae
- Clade: Tracheophytes
- Clade: Angiosperms
- Clade: Monocots
- Clade: Commelinids
- Order: Poales
- Family: Cyperaceae
- Genus: Schoenus
- Species: S. aureus

Binomial name
- Schoenus aureus T.L.Elliott & Muasya
- Documented collection localities

= Schoenus aureus =

Species of grass-like plant

Schoenus aureus is a species of sedge endemic to the western mountains of the Western Cape Provinces of South Africa.

== Description ==
Schoenus aureus is a relatively robust, light-coloured sedge with ivory-coloured culm bases, long, membranaceous ligules, and golden-brown glumes. This species has flat leaves and inflorescence bracts, as well as a compact inflorescence. A fully developed nutlet of S. aureus is yet to be observed.

The most similar species to S. aureus is Schoenus triticoides; however, S. aureus has a shorter, more compact panicle compared to that of S. triticoides.. In addition, S aureus has less pronounced veins on the primary inflorescence bracts than S. triticoides.

Schoenus megacarpus also has flat leaves and inflorescence bracts, but it has a much longer nutlet than S. aureus.

Schoenus aureus has a compact panicle that is similar to Schoenus compar and S. megacarpus in form; however, S. compar lacks the wide marginal membranaceous extensions of the lower parts of its inflorescences that are found in S. aureus. In addition, S. megacarpus has darker inflorescence bracts and more evident veins on the lower primary inflorescence than S. aureus.

Similar to other sedges, plants in this group are very difficult to identify. It appears that part of this problem is caused by the tendency of the southern African Schoenus to form hybrids with each other. However, hybridization is yet to be observed in S. aureus.

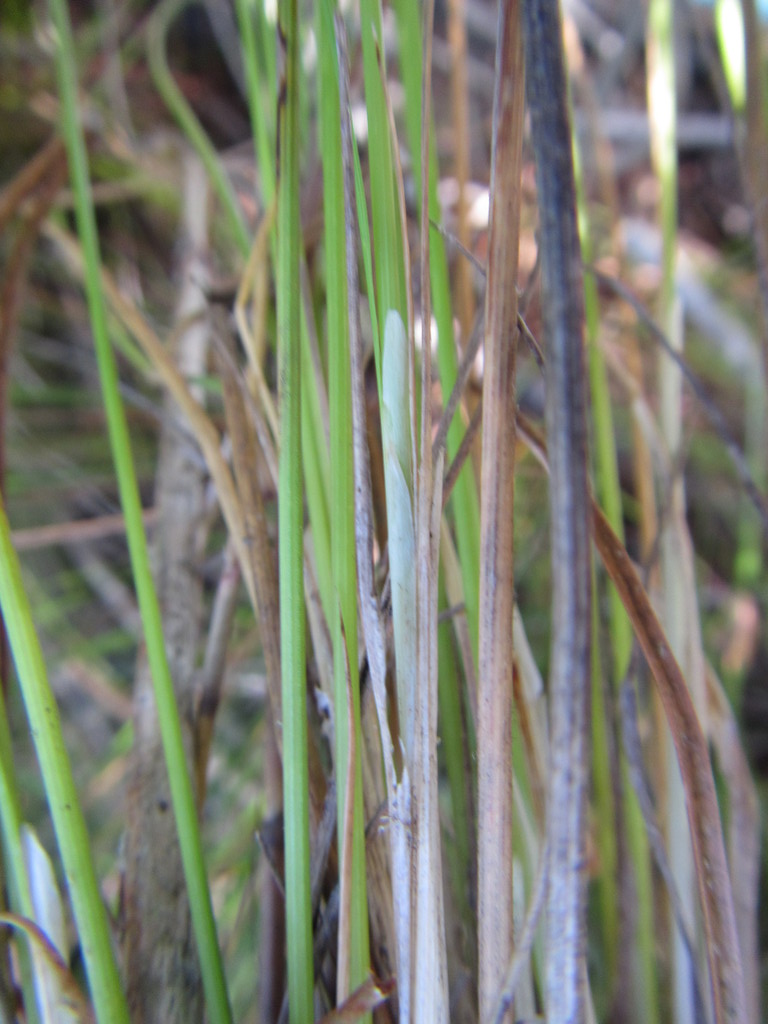
Bases of flowering stems

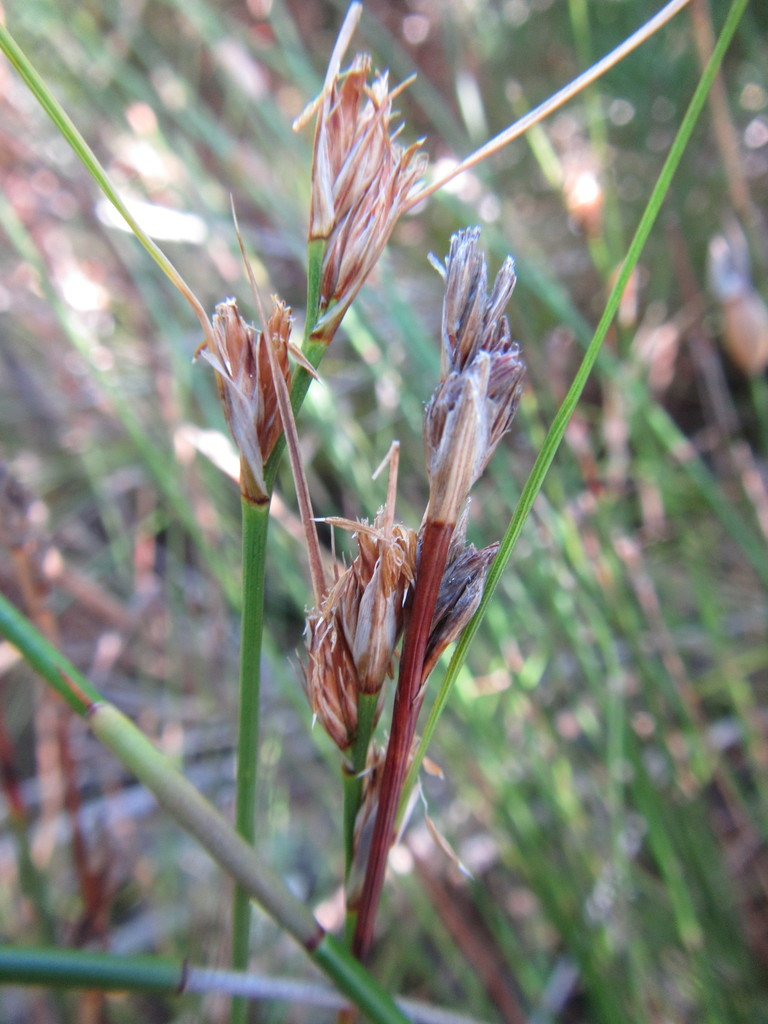
Flowering heads

Spike

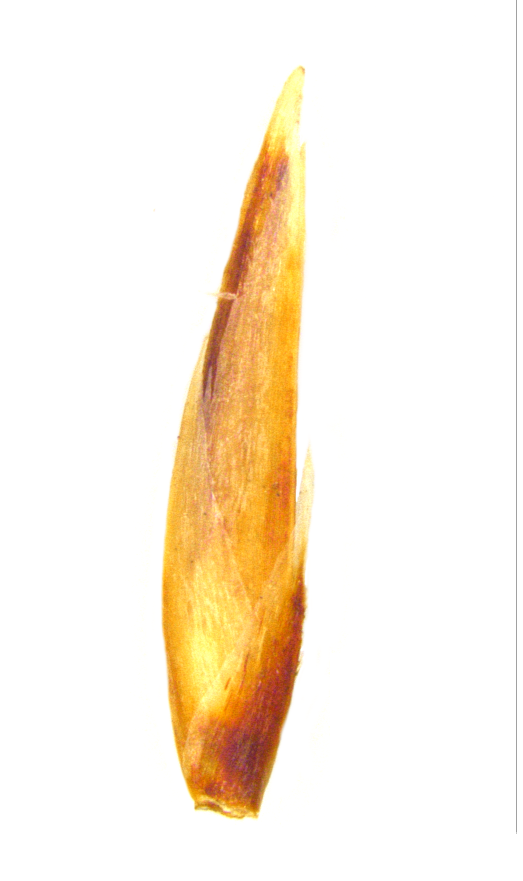
Spikelet

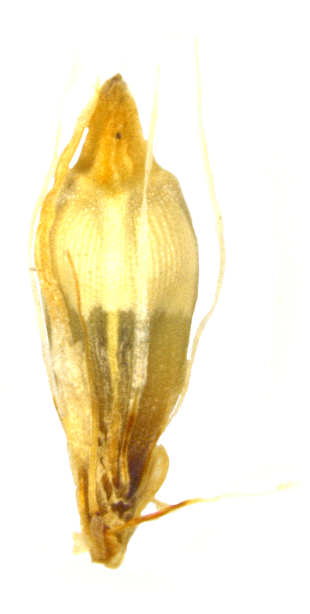
Nutlet

== Taxonomy ==
Schoenus arenicola is a species of flowering plant in the family Cyperaceae, tribe Schoeneae. Southern African Schoenus were once classified as Tetraria; however, based on molecular and morphological differences, the two groups are considered evolutionary distinct. To ensure that this group of sedges is monophyletic (i.e. the genus only has closely related species), several species of Epischoenus and the southern African Tetraria were transferred into Schoenus. In the field, the southern African Schoenus can be distinguished from Tetraria species by their lack of stem leaves and the absence of reticulate sheaths at the bases of the flowering stems.

If S. aureus forms hybrids with other southern African Schoenus species, it is most likely to hybridize with other species in the Schoenus compar – Schoenus pictus and allies group.

== Distribution and ecology ==
Schoenus aureus grows in mountainous habitats of the Western Cape Provinces of South Africa, in the area near Worcester. This species generally grows within fynbos vegetation on mountain slopes.

== Images ==
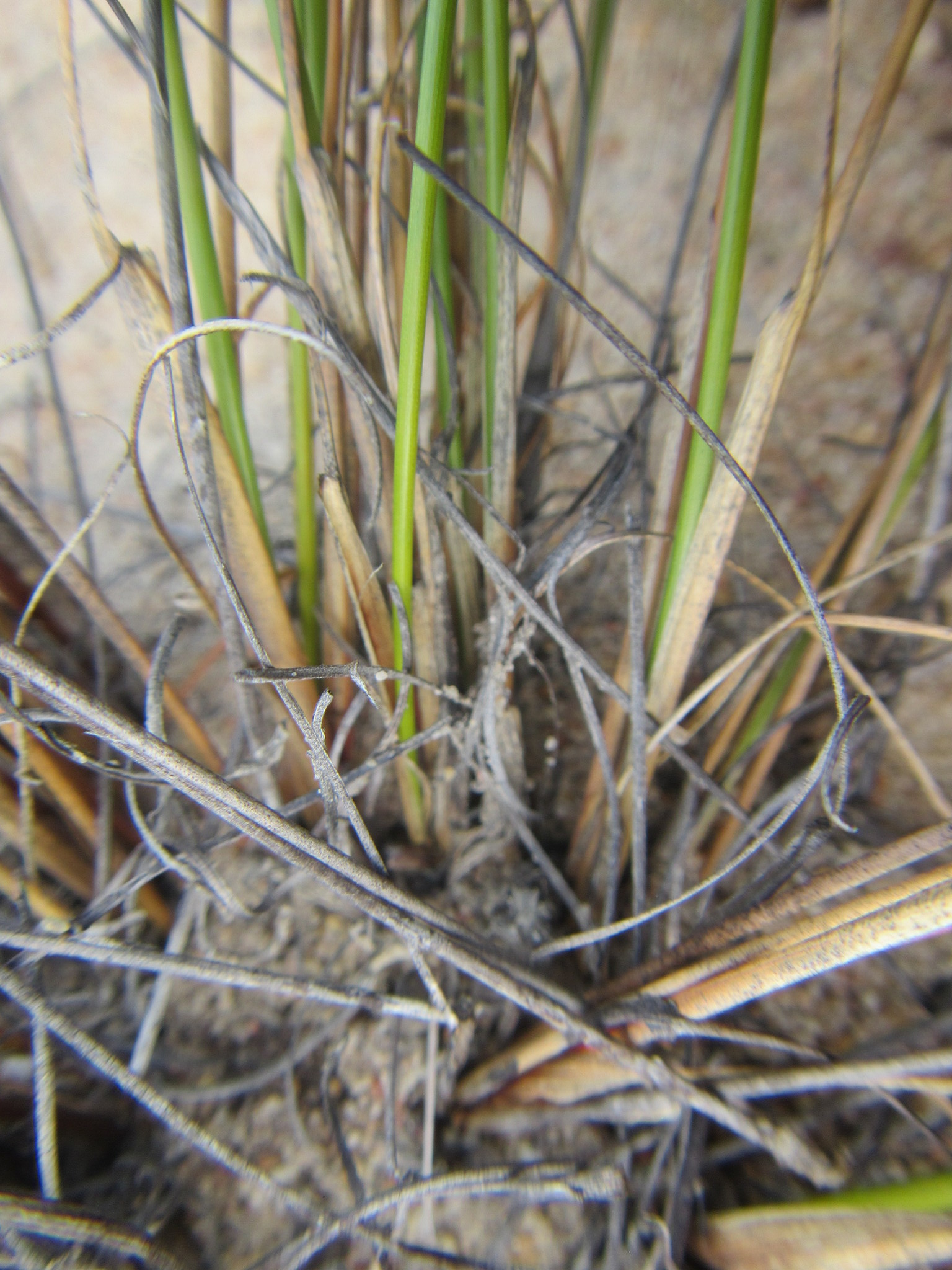
Stem bases of S. aureus

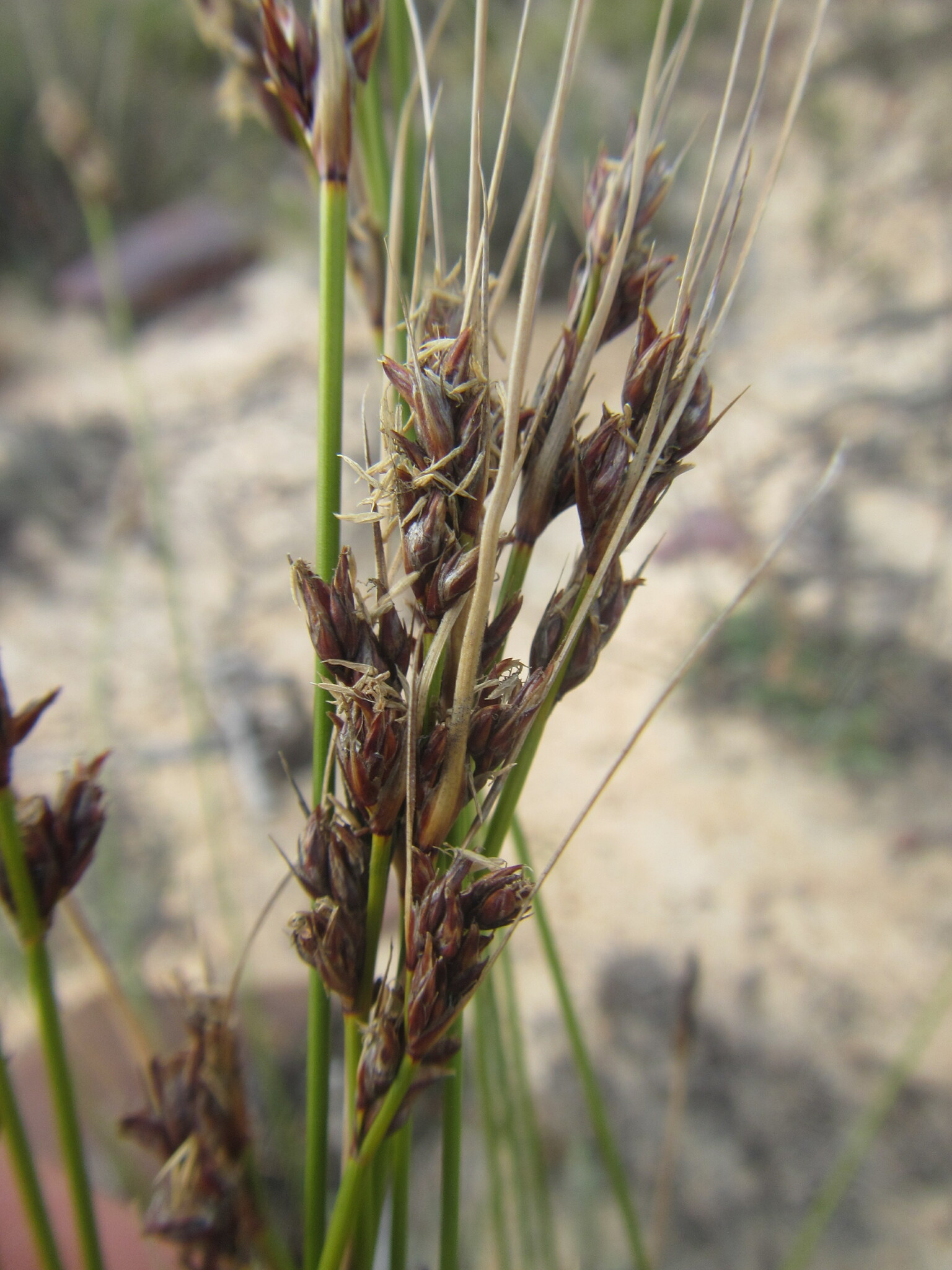
Flowering heads of S. aureus
