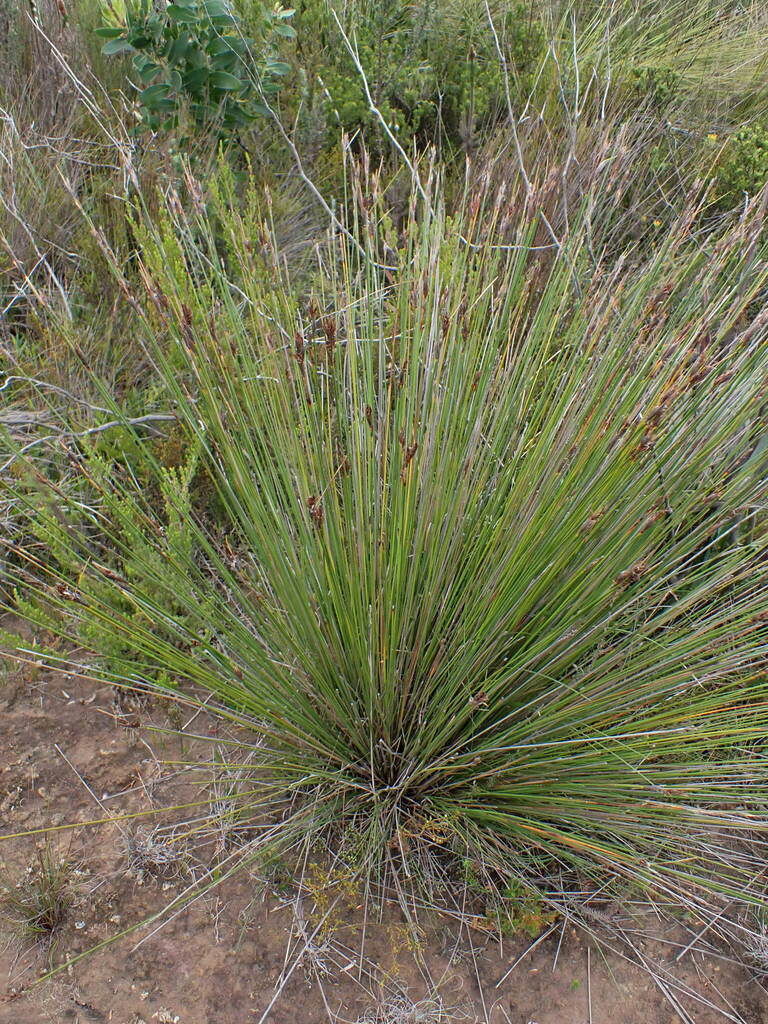
- Bignut veldrush

Scientific classification
- Kingdom: Plantae
- Clade: Tracheophytes
- Clade: Angiosperms
- Clade: Monocots
- Clade: Commelinids
- Order: Poales
- Family: Cyperaceae
- Genus: Schoenus
- Species: S. megacarpus

Binomial name
- Schoenus megacarpus T.L.Elliott & Muasya
- Documented collection localities in South Africa

= Schoenus megacarpus =

Species of grass-like plant

Schoenus megacarpus is a species of sedge endemic to the south-central region of South Africa.

== Diagnostic characters ==
Key diagnostic characters of S. megacarpus are its primary inflorescence bracts that are expanded proximally with membranaceous extensions. In addition, the bases of the flowering stems are often reddish. This species tends to have longer spikelets and nutlets compared to other species in the S. compar - S. pictus and allies group.

Schoenus megacarpus appears similar to Schoenus compar; however, it does not have the viscous flowering stems and inflorescences that are present in S. compar. Furthermore, S. megacarpus has red culm bases, whereas those of S. compar are usually ivory. Another key difference is that the primary inflorescence bracts of S. megacarpus have primary inflorescence bracts that are expanded proximally and have lateral membranaceous extensions.

Similar to other sedges, plants in this group are very difficult to identify. It appears that part of this problem is caused by the tendency of the southern African Schoenus to form hybrids with each other. However, hybridization is yet to be observed in S. megacarpus.

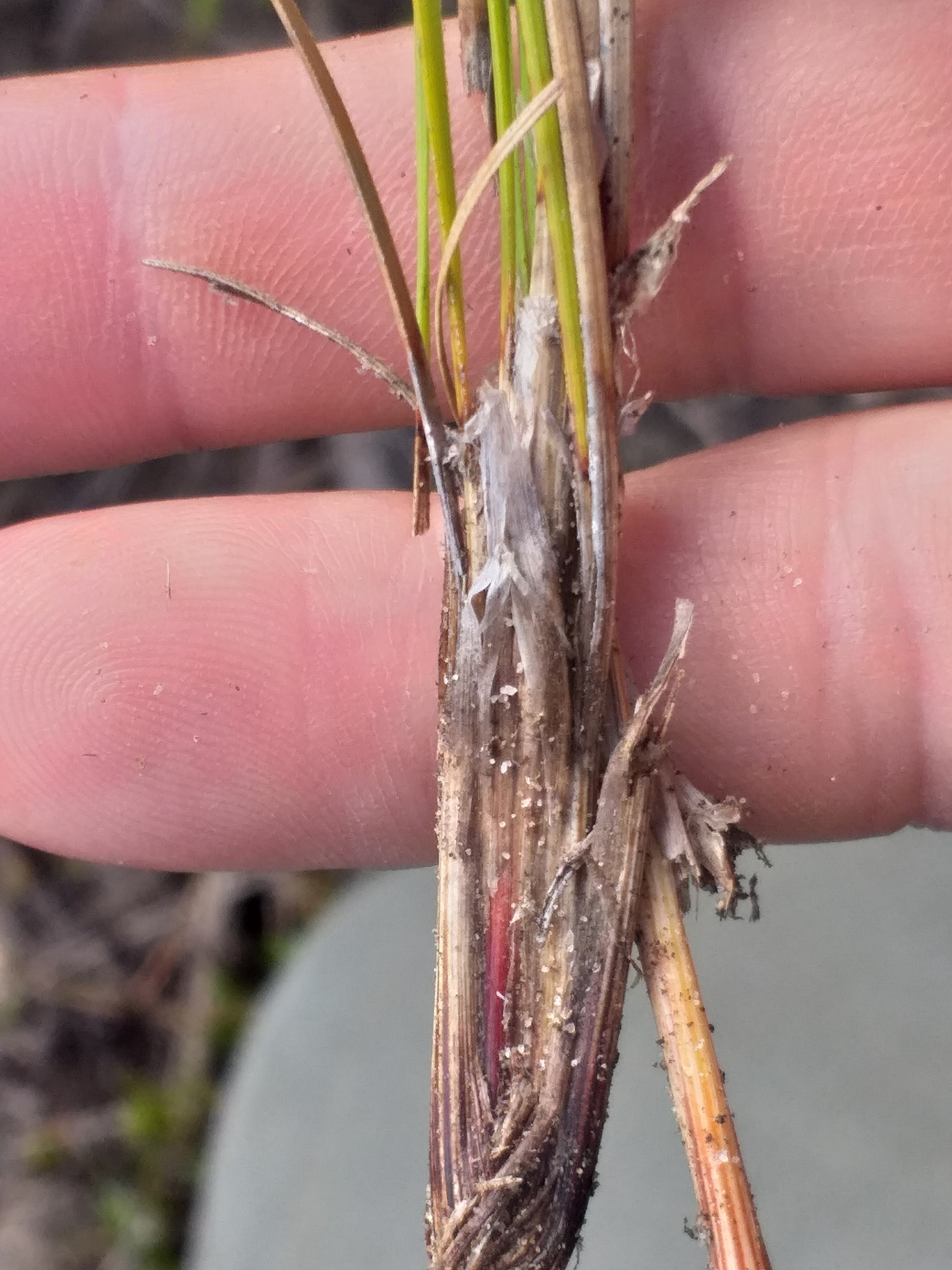
Base of culm with membranaceous sheaths

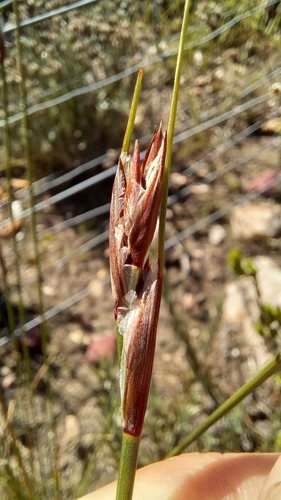
Flowering head

Spikelet

Nutlet

== Taxonomy ==
Schoenus megacarpus is a species in family Cyperaceae, tribe Schoeneae. Other notable genera in tribe Schoeneae include Lepidosperma, Oreobolus, Costularia, Tetraria and Gahnia. The most closely related species to S. megacarpus are other southern African Schoenus species, specifically, species in the S. compar – S. pictus group.

Southern African Schoenus were once classified as Tetraria; however, based on molecular and morphological differences, we now know that the two groups are evolutionary distinct. To ensure that this group of sedges is monophyletic (i.e. the genus only has closely related species), several species of Epischoenus and the southern African Tetraria were transferred into Schoenus. In the field, the southern African Schoenus can be distinguished from Tetraria species by their lack of stem leaves and the absence of reticulate sheaths at the bases of the flowering stems.

== Distribution and ecology ==
Schoenus megacarpus grows throughout south-central South Africa, with its distribution ranging from the Anysberg Nature Reserve in the west to the Grahamstown area in the east.

Most reports of this species are from high mountain slopes (above 1000 m) surrounded by fynbos vegetation. However, eastern collections of this species come from grassland vegetation at lower elevations.

== Images ==
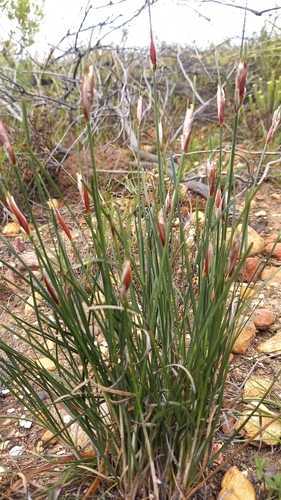
Growth form of Schoenus megacarpus

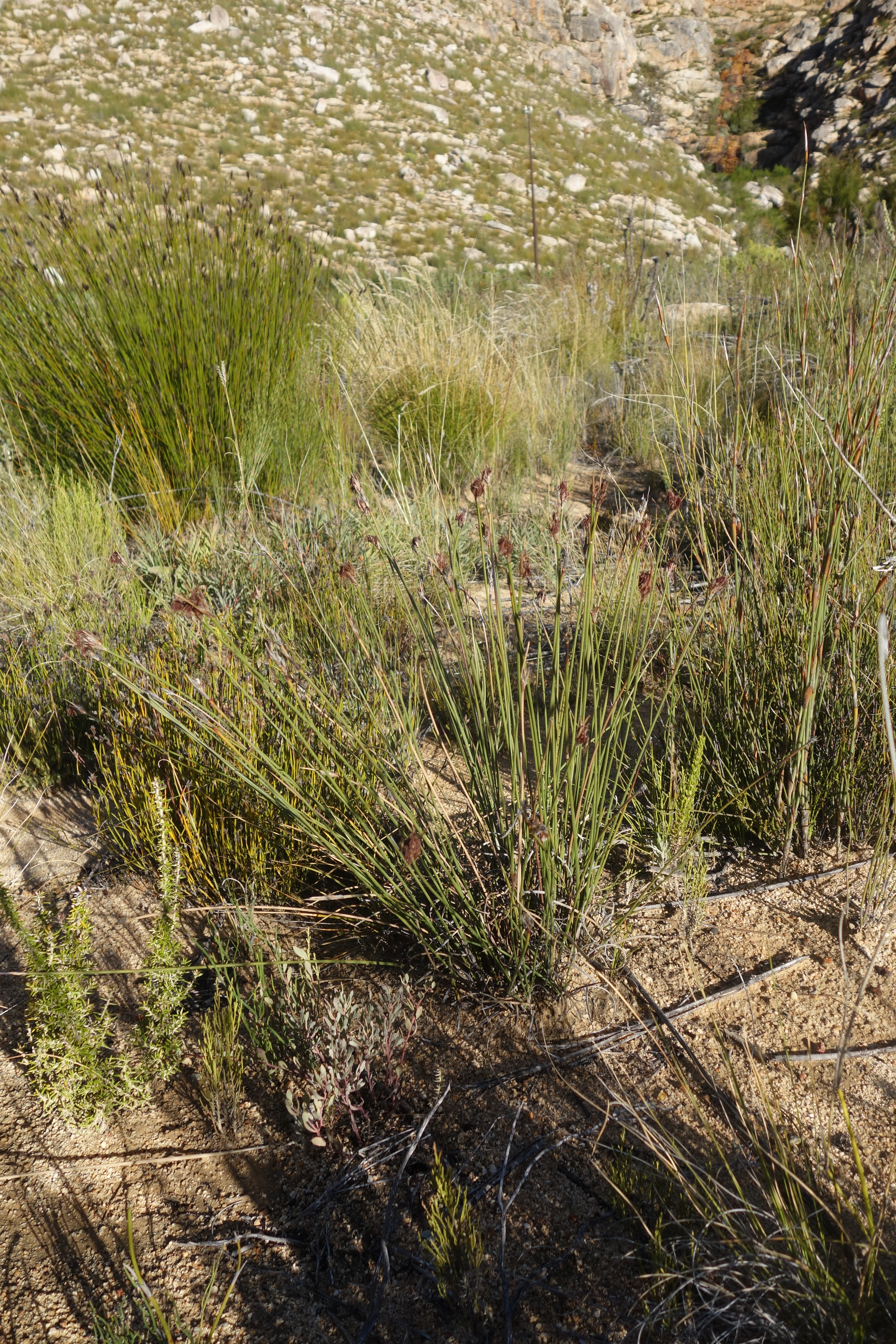
Growth form of Schoenus megacarpus

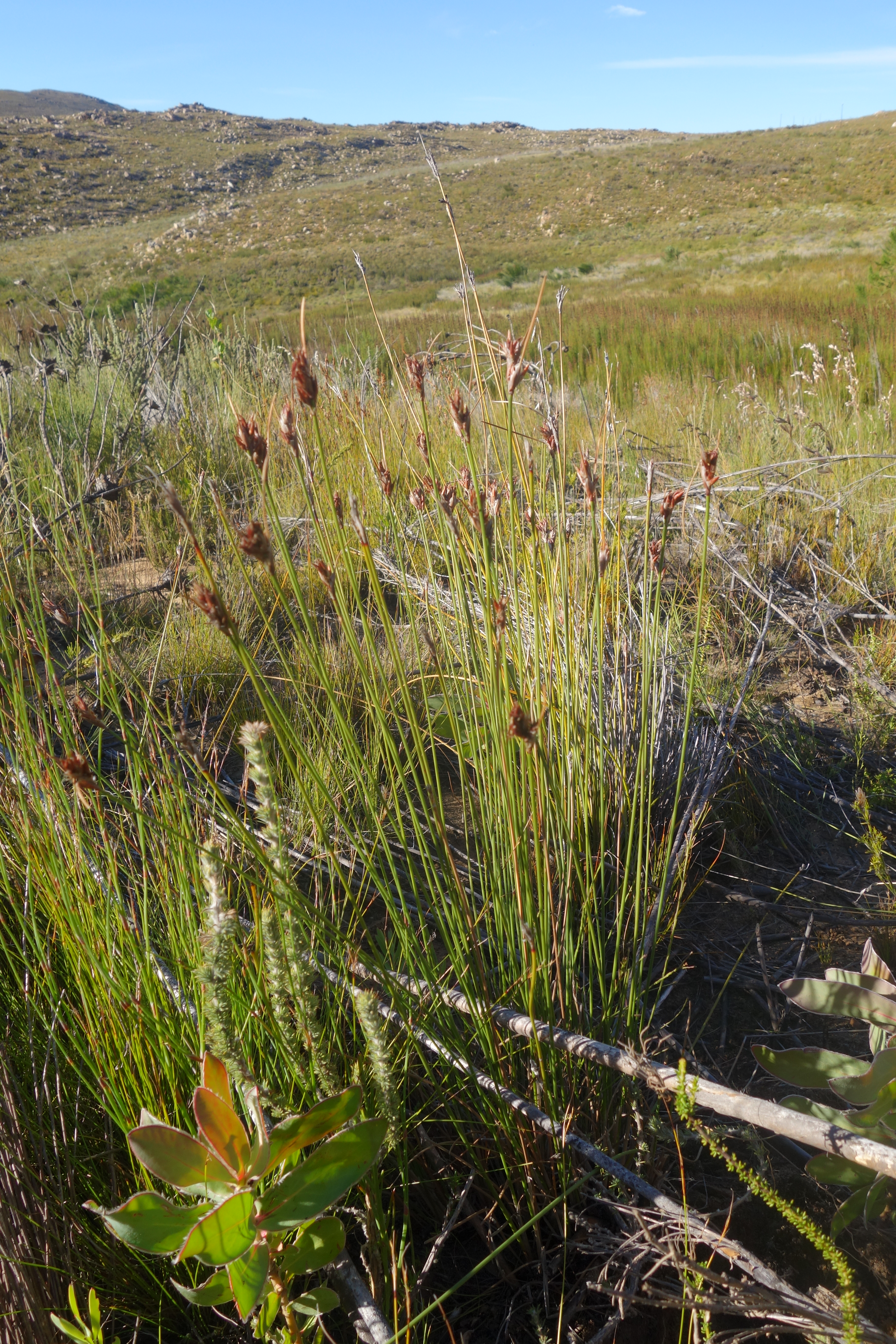
Growth form of Schoenus megacarpus

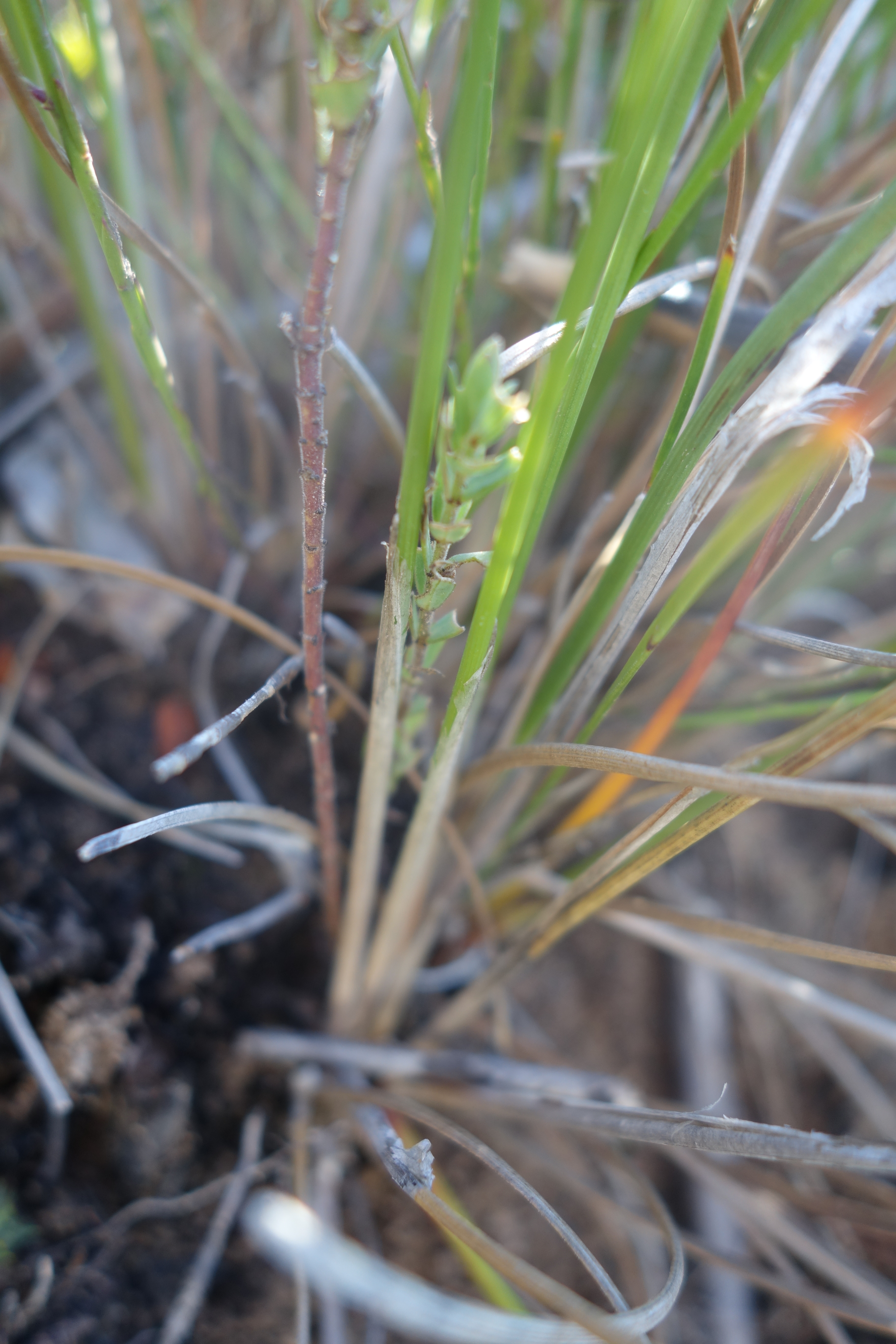
Base of culm with membranaceous sheaths

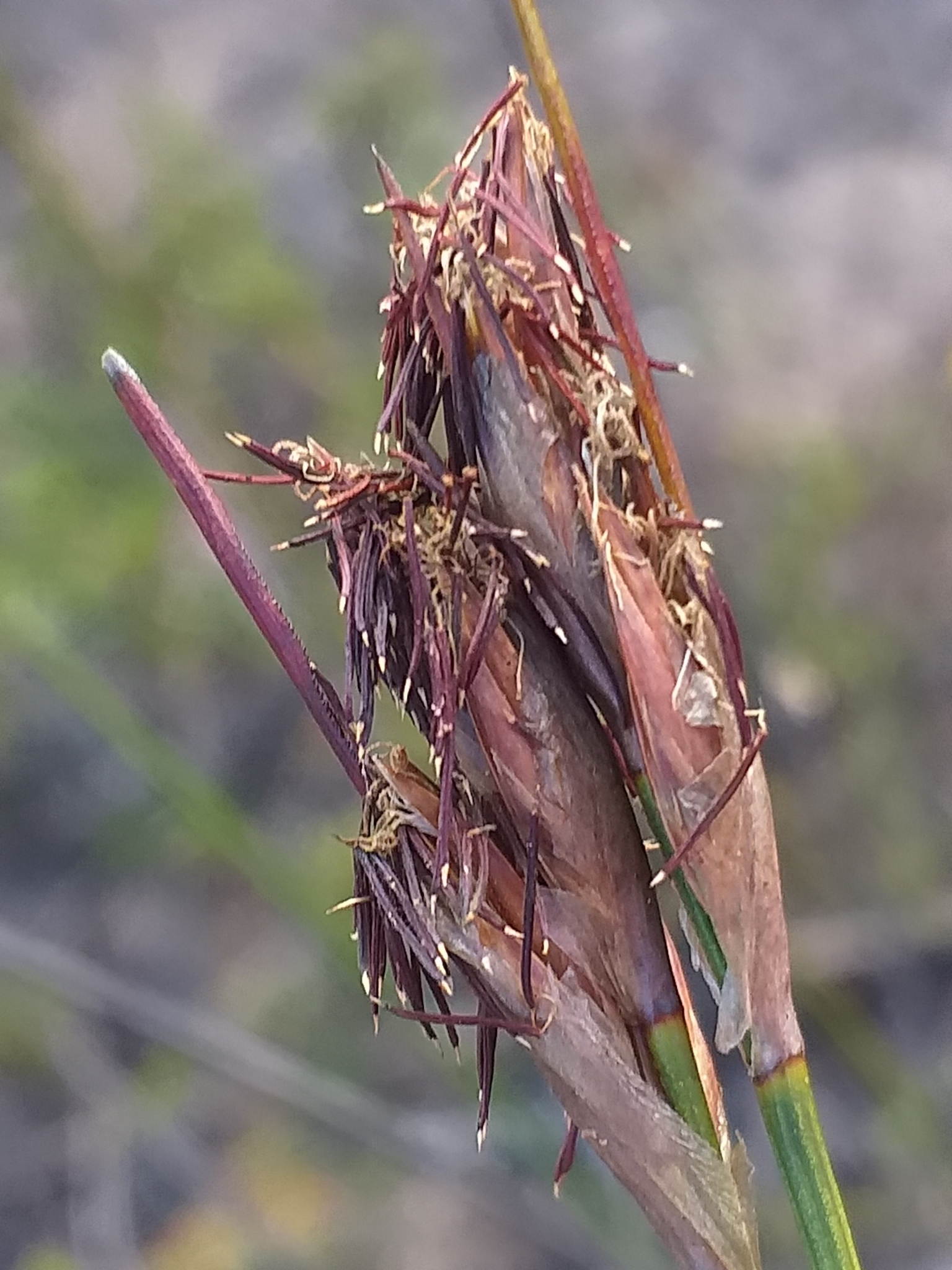
Flowering heads with stamens

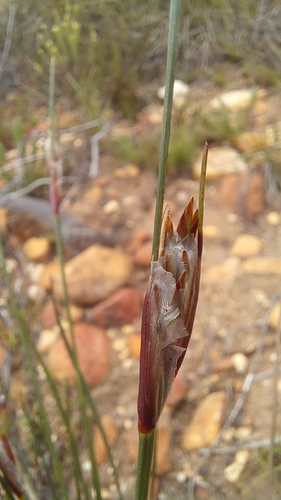
Flowering head

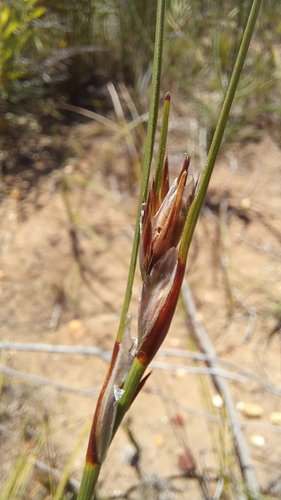
Flowering head (inflorescence)

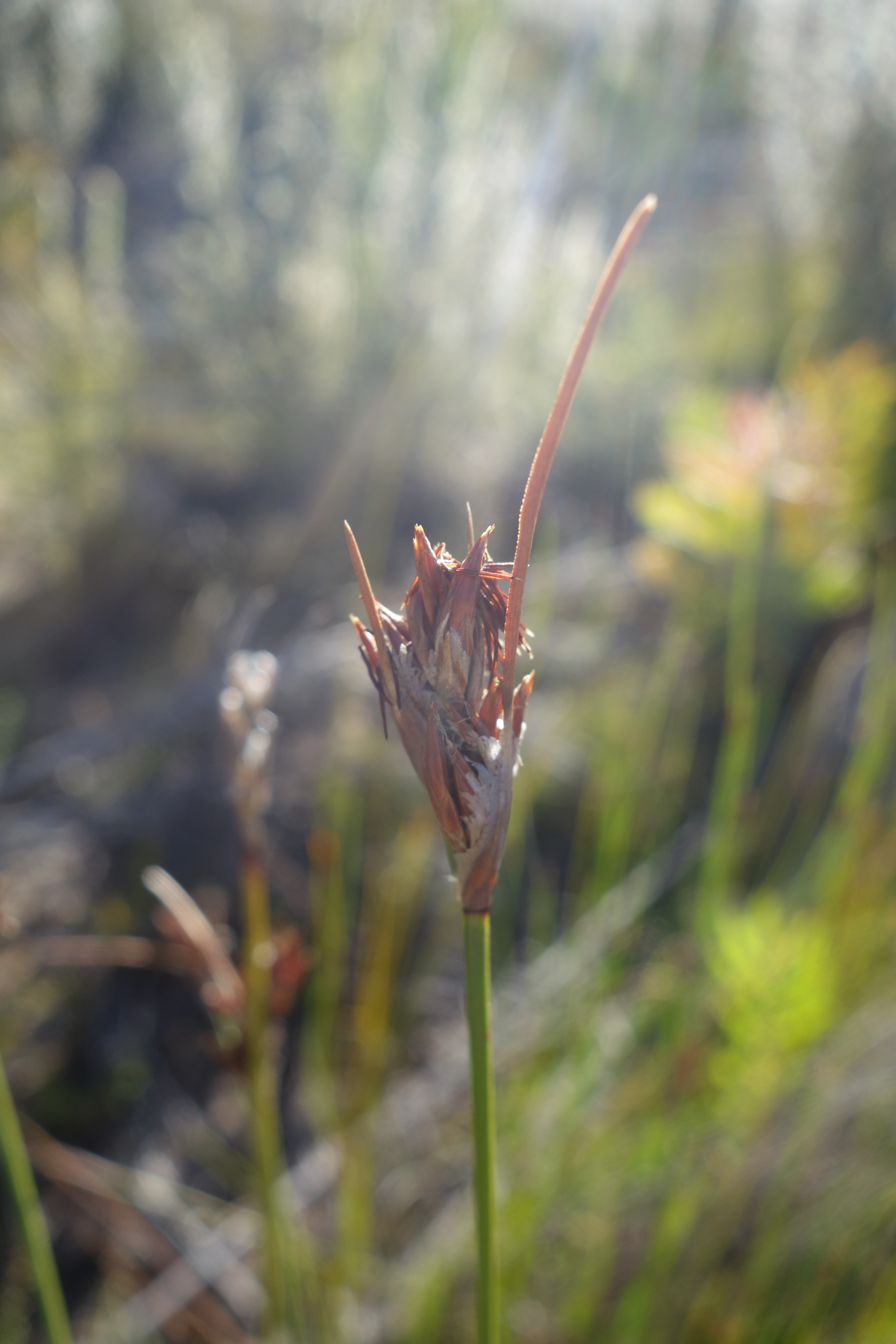
Flowering head
