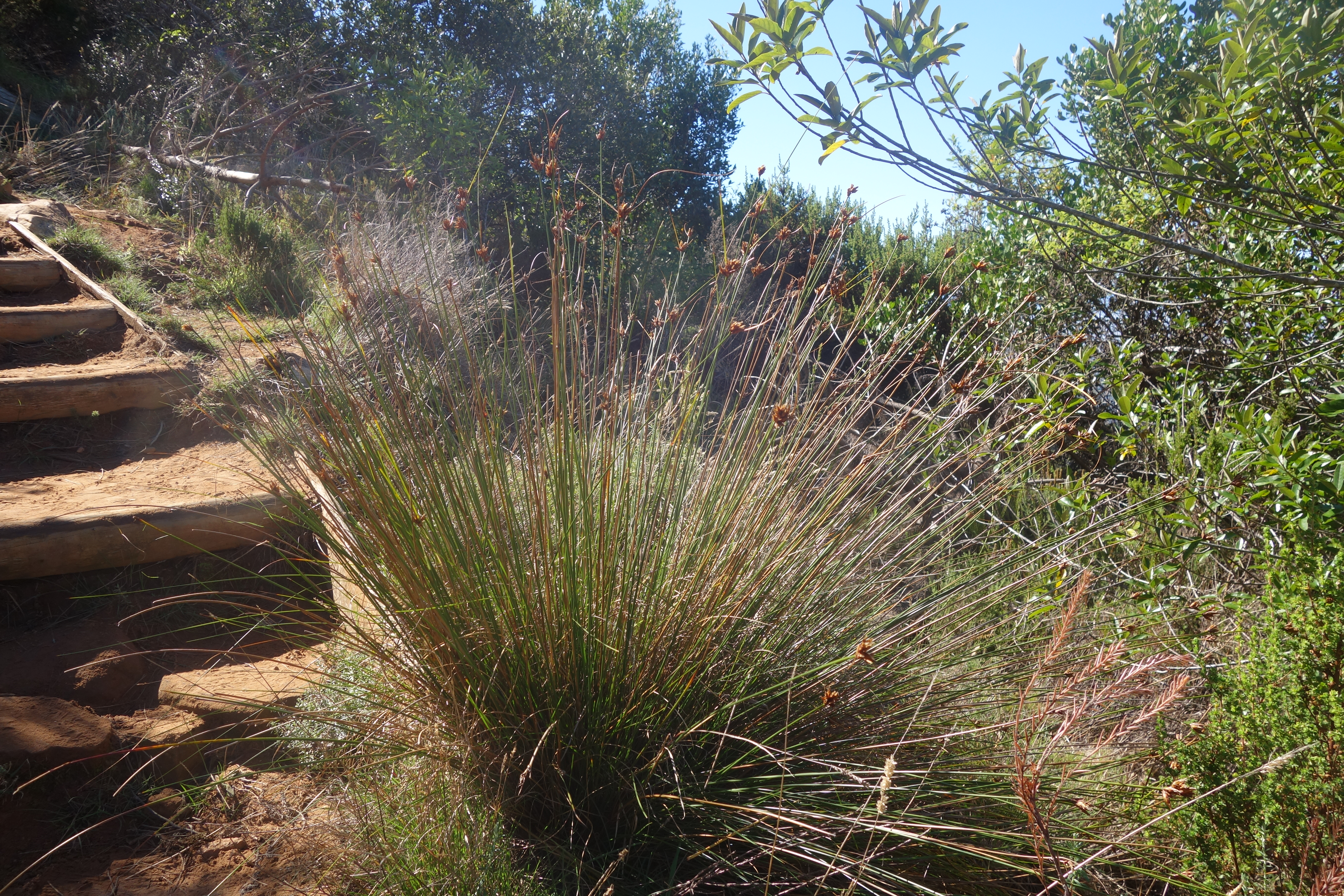
- Ivory veldrush

Scientific classification
- Kingdom: Plantae
- Clade: Tracheophytes
- Clade: Angiosperms
- Clade: Monocots
- Clade: Commelinids
- Order: Poales
- Family: Cyperaceae
- Genus: Schoenus
- Species: S. compar

Binomial name
- Schoenus compar L.
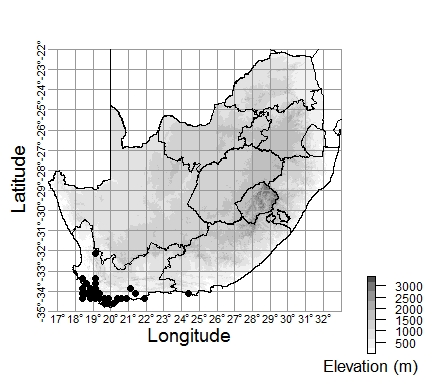
- Documented collection localities in South Africa

Synonyms
- Tetraria compar (L.) T.Lestib.; Elynanthus compar (L.) T.Lestib. ex Nees; Elynanthus compar (L.) Boeckeler; Tetraria compar (L.) C.B.Clarke; Tetraria thuarii P.Beauv.; Elynanthus arenarius (Schrad.) Nees; Schoenus arenarius Schrad.; Elynanthus viscosus (Schrad.) Nees; Schoenus pungens Willd. ex Kunth; Tetraria compar var. β minor Kük.

= Schoenus compar =

Species of grass-like plant

Schoenus compar (ivory veldrush) is a species of sedge endemic to southern South Africa.

== Diagnostic characters ==
Similar to other sedges, plants in this group are very difficult to identify. It appears that part of this problem is caused by the tendency of the southern African Schoenus to form hybrids with each other. However, hybridization is yet to be observed in S. compar.

This species is one of the more conspicuous Southern African Schoenus species. Key diagnostic characters include papery, ivory leaf sheaths, as well as compact and thick inflorescences. The spikelet glumes are relatively firm and viscous, and range in colour from gold when young to reddish-brown when mature. Part of the plant is viscous, especially the culm bases and inflorescences.

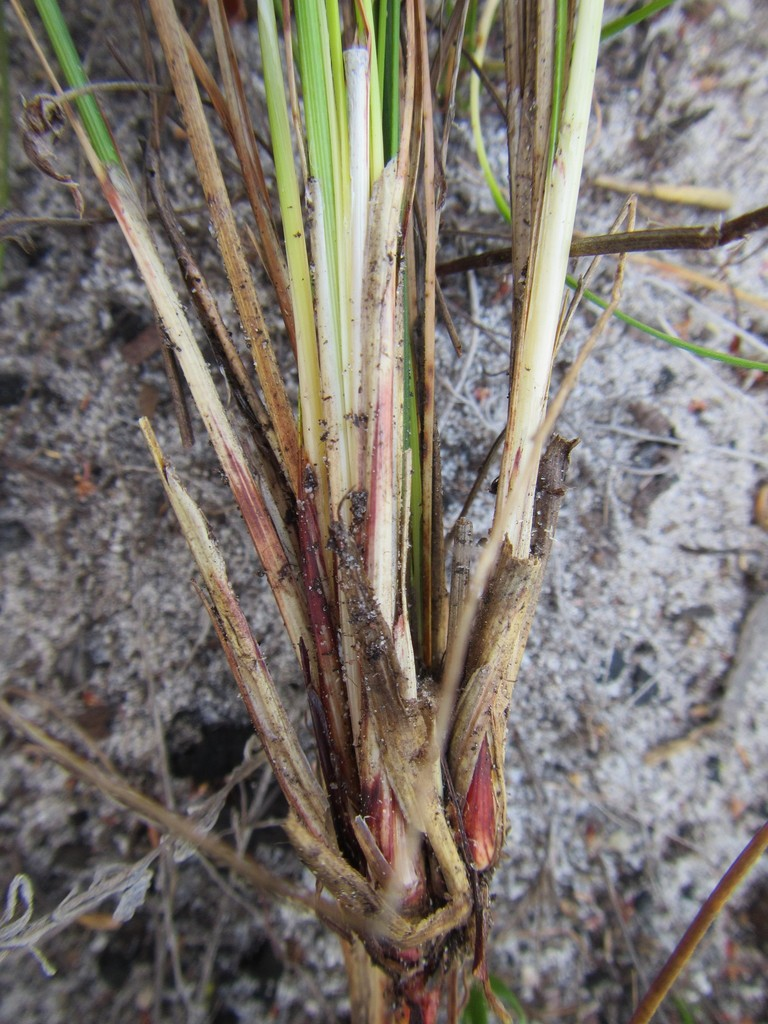
White base of flowering culms

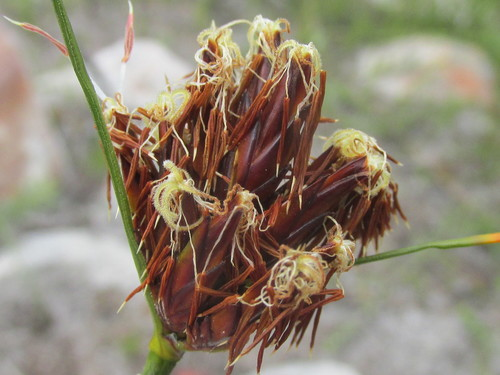
Flowering head (inflorescence) showing anthers and stigmas

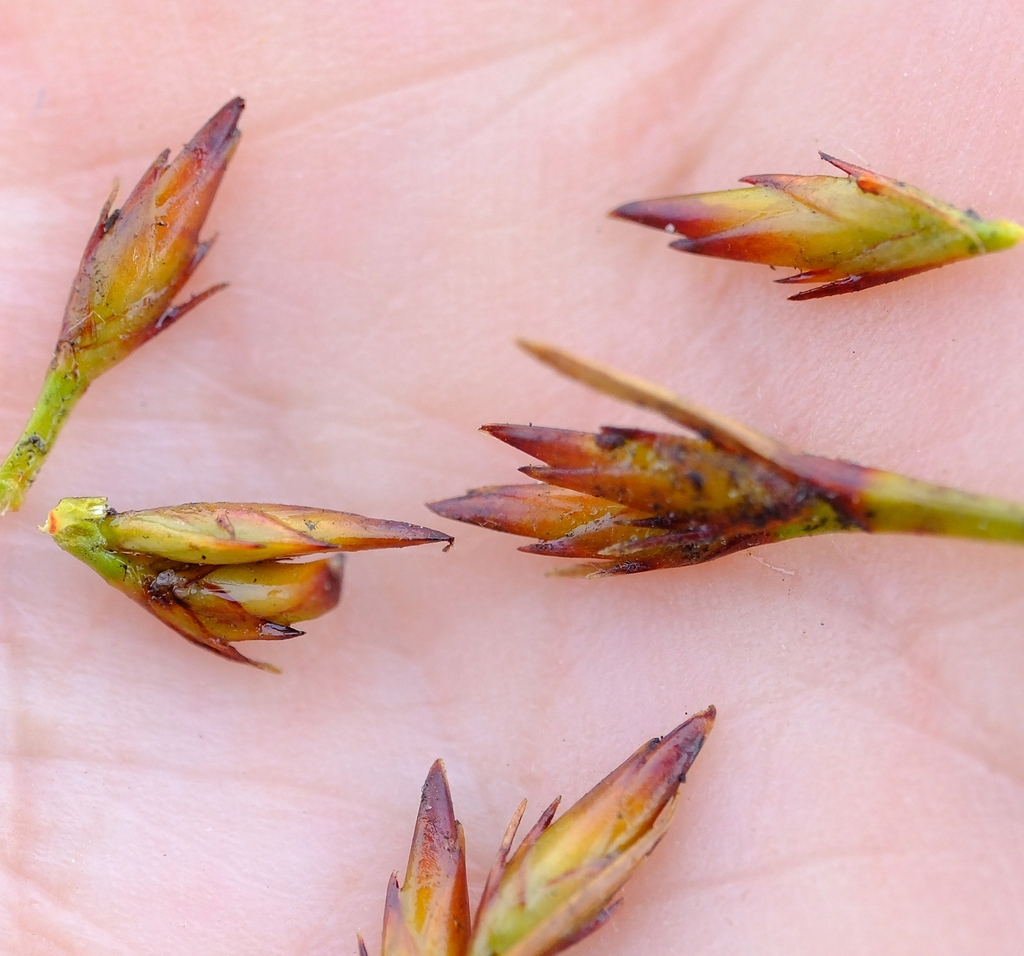
Viscous spikelets

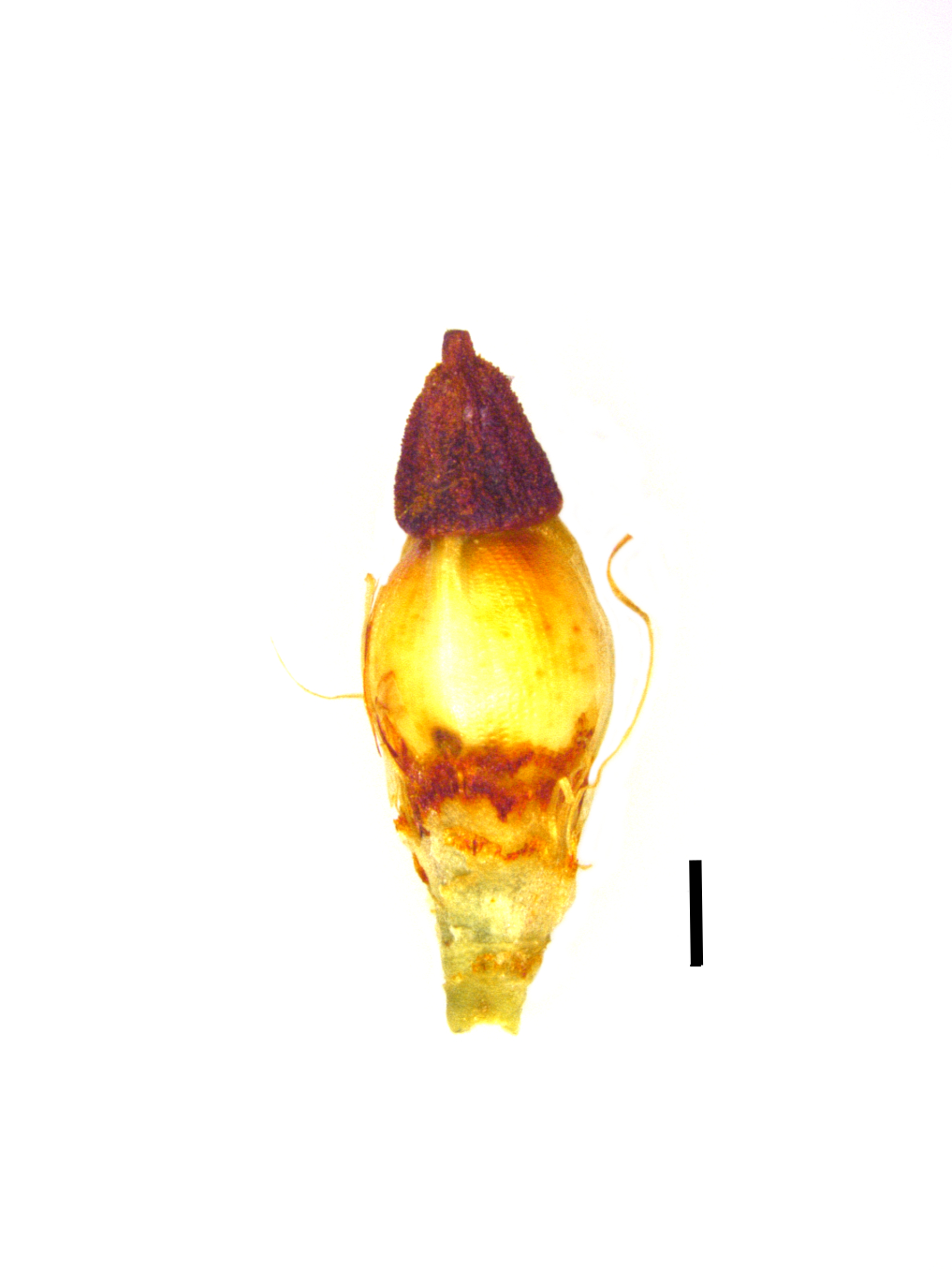
Nutlet (black scale bar represents 1 mm)

== Taxonomy ==
Schoenus compar is a species in family Cyperaceae, tribe Schoeneae. Other notable genera in tribe Schoeneae include Lepidosperma, Oreobolus, Costularia, Tetraria and Gahnia. The most closely related species to S. compar are other southern African Schoenus species, specifically, species in the Schoenus compar - Schoenus pictus group.

Southern African Schoenus were once classified as Tetraria; however, based on molecular and morphological differences, we now know that the two groups are evolutionary distinct. To ensure that this group of sedges is monophyletic (i.e. the genus only has closely related species), several species of Epischoenus and the southern African Tetraria were transferred into Schoenus. In the field, the southern African Schoenus can be distinguished from Tetraria species by their lack of stem leaves and the absence of reticulate sheaths at the bases of the flowering stems.

== Distribution and ecology ==
Schoenus compar mostly occurs in southwestern South Africa, although it reaches Humansdorp in the East and the Cederberg mountains in the north. It is a species that grows on coarser growing substrates (e.g. sand or rocks) at lower elevations (20 m to over 800 m) than other Southern African Schoenus species. This species mostly grows on dry sites among fynbos vegetation.

== Images ==
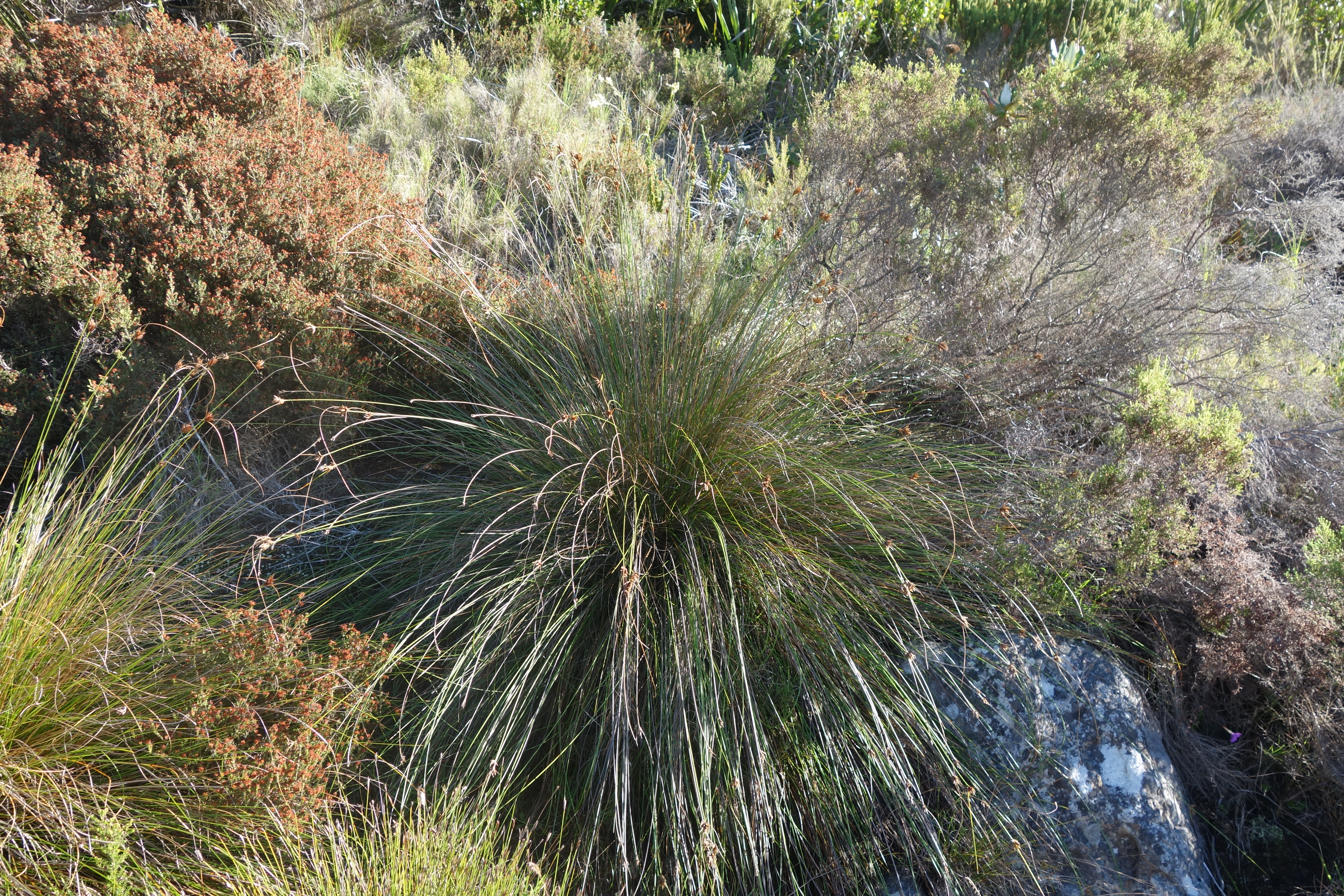
Growth form

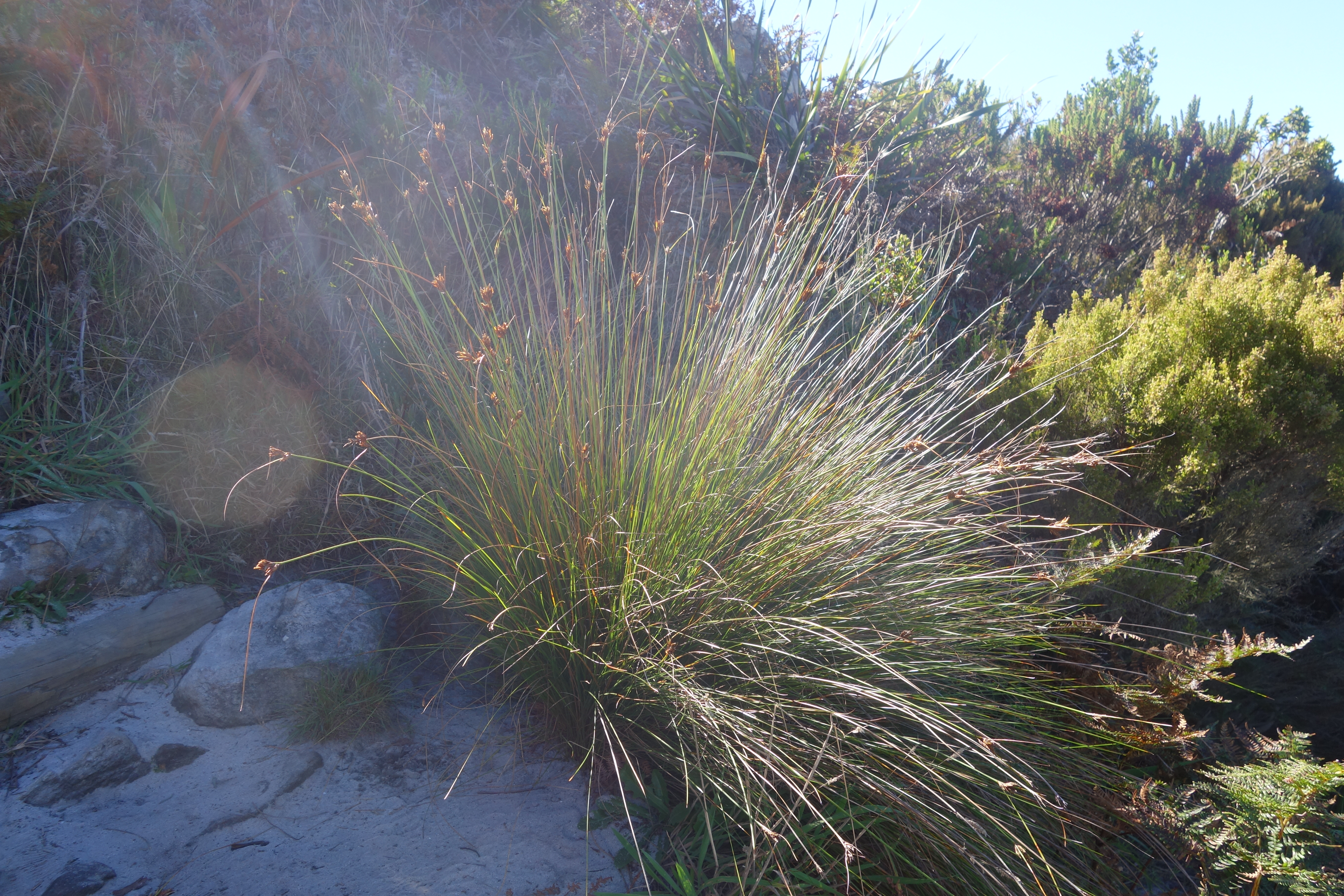
Growth form

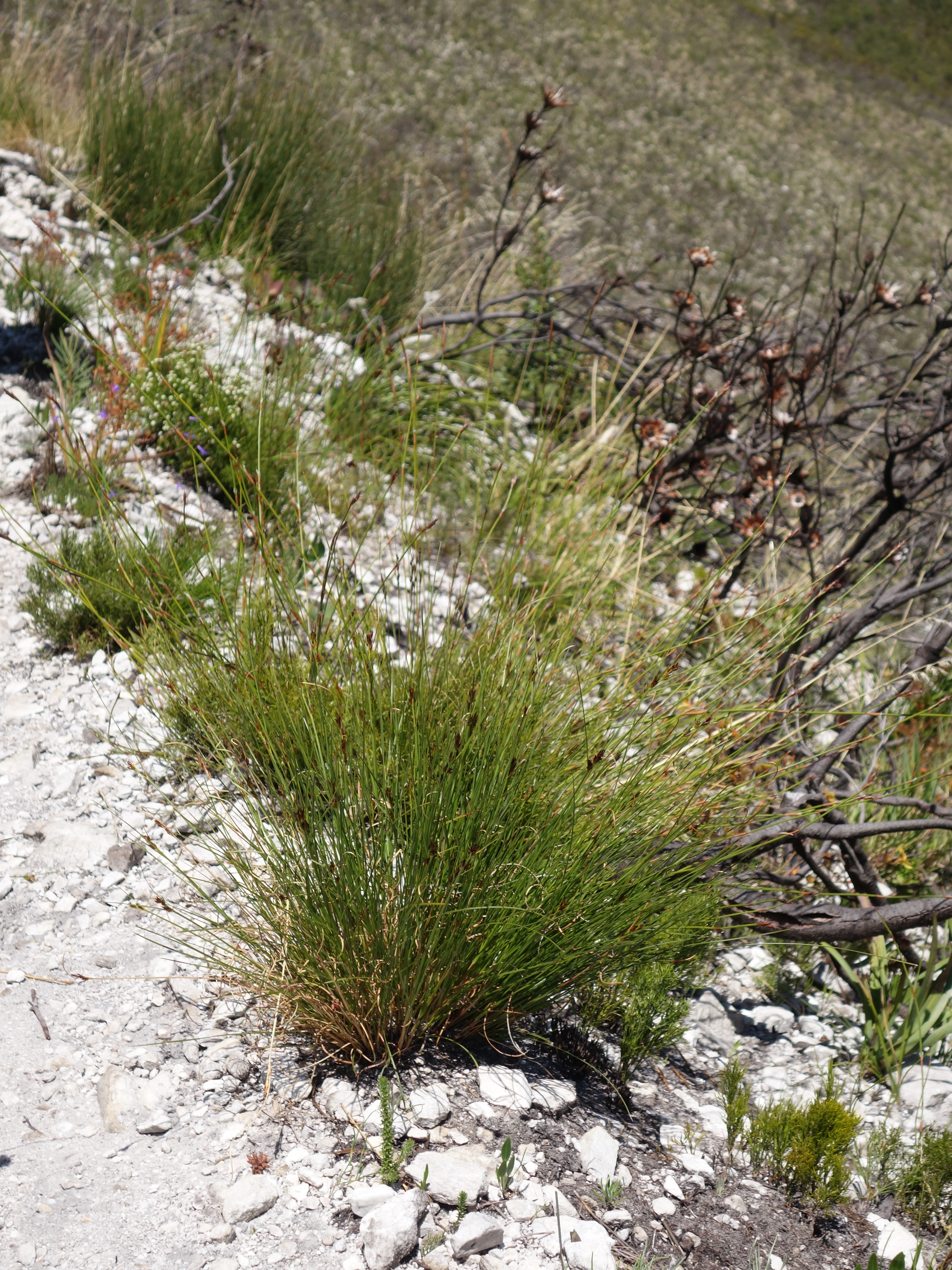
Growth form

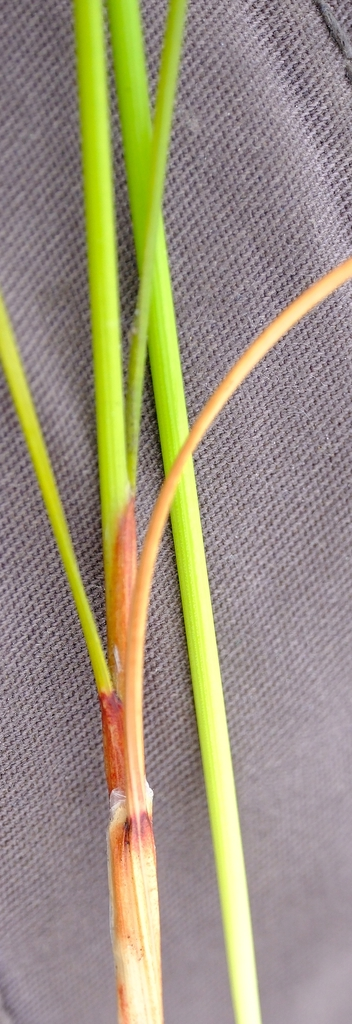
Base of flowering stem (culm)

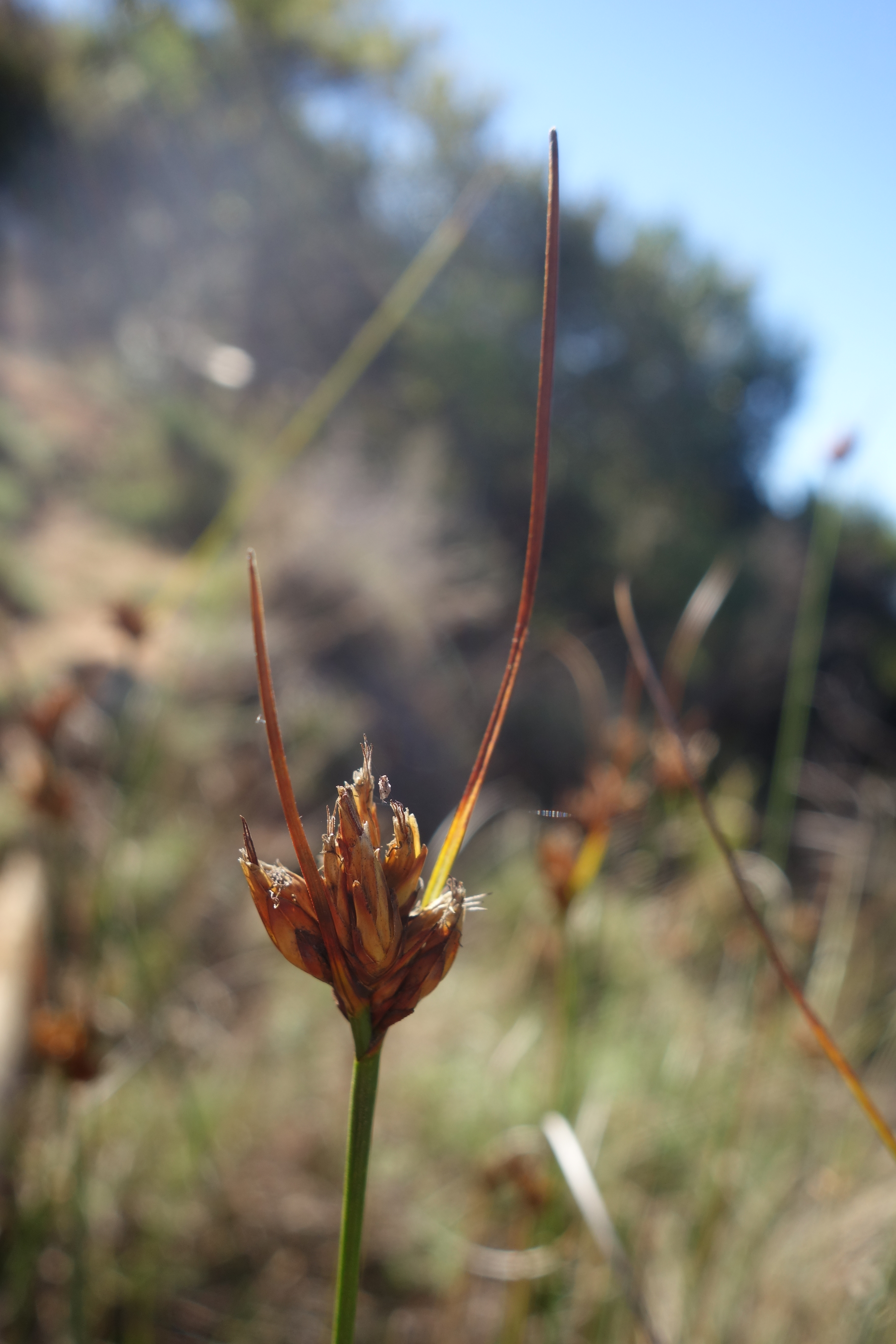
Inflorescence

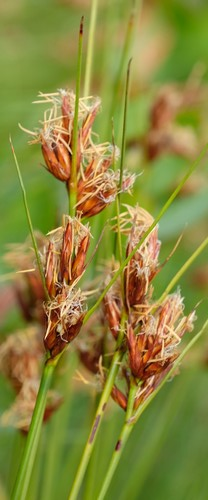
Inflorescences with anthers and stigmas evident

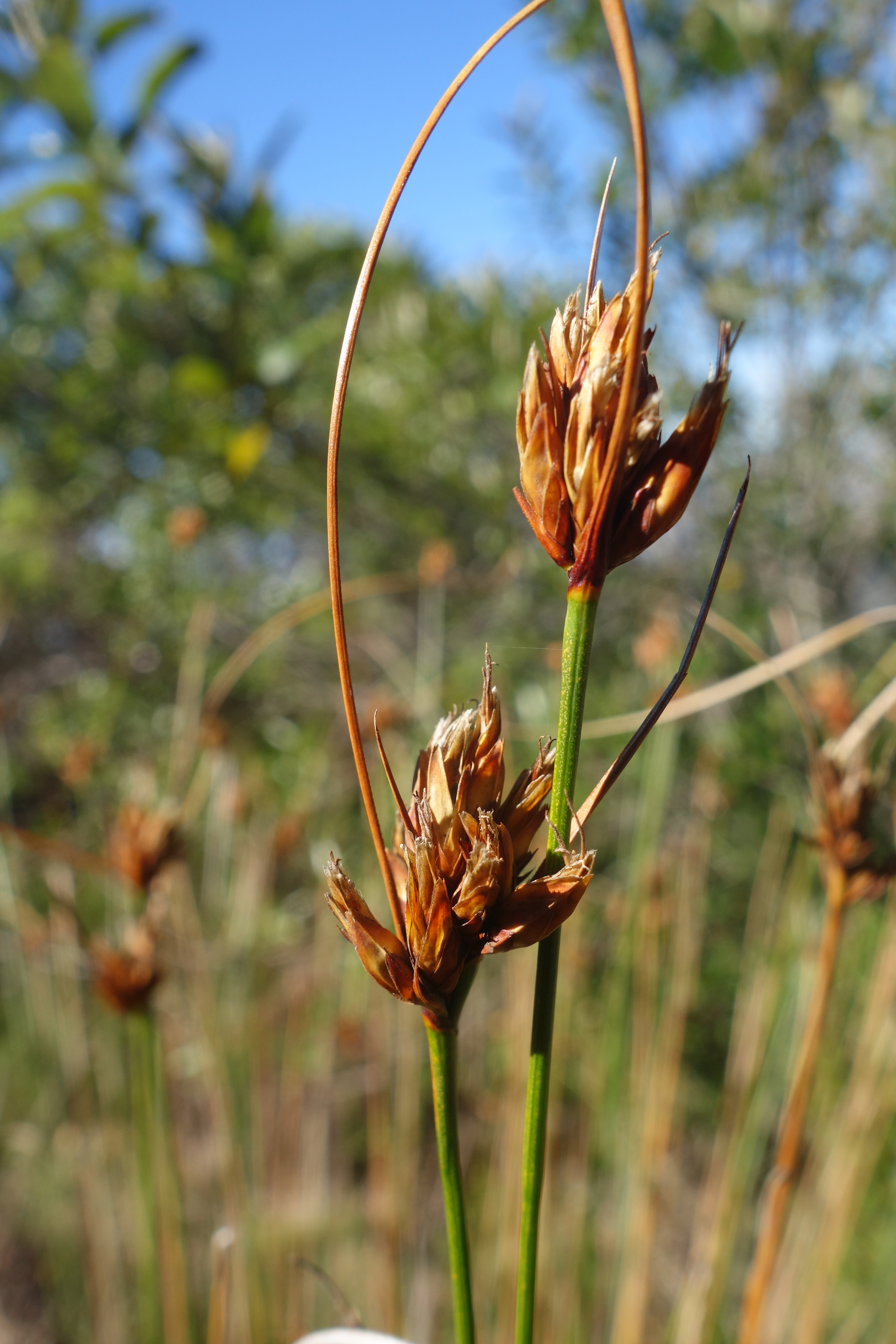
Inflorescences

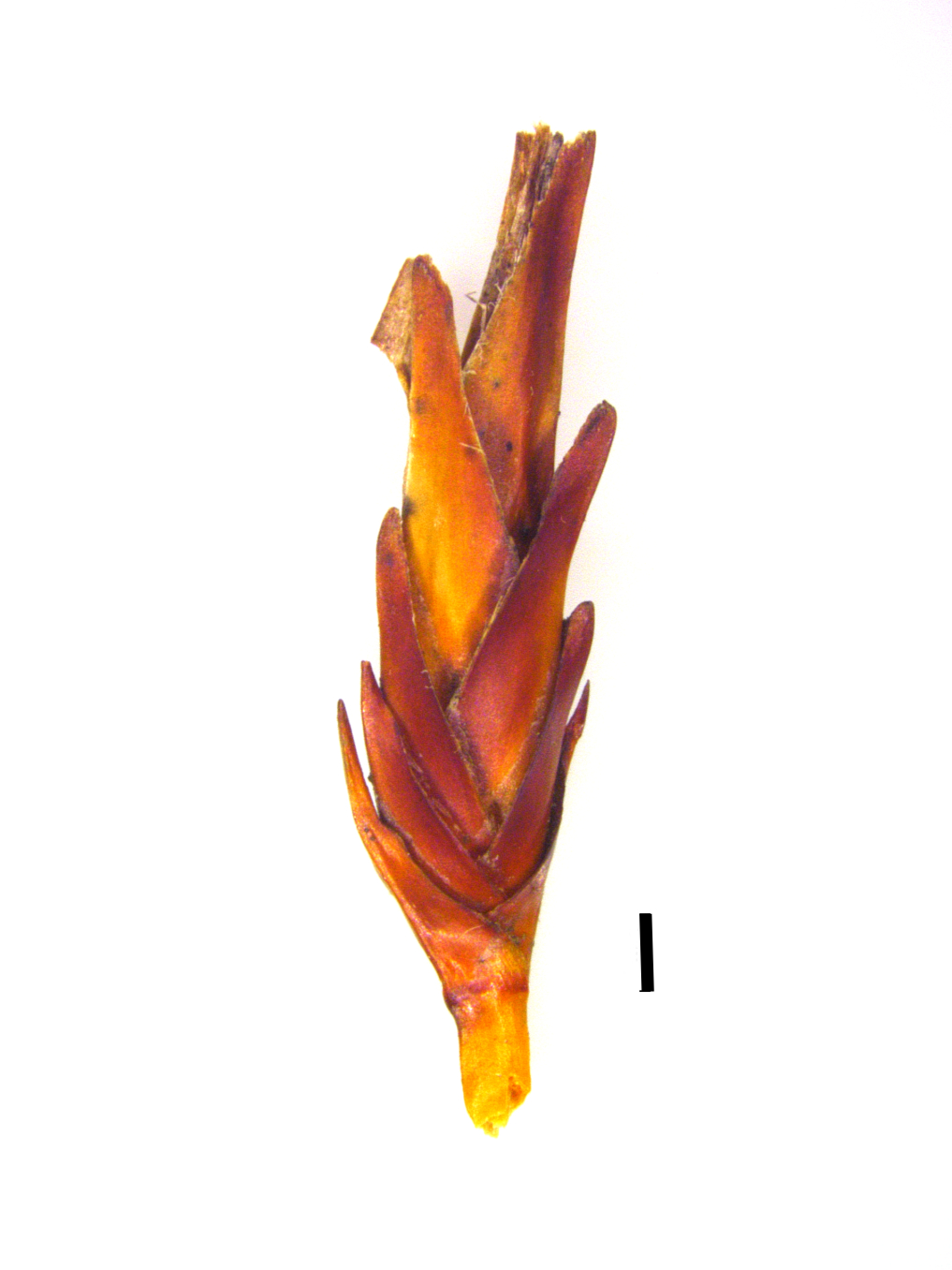
Spikelet (black scale bar represents 1 mm)
